= Enemy release hypothesis =

The enemy release hypothesis is among the most widely proposed explanations for the dominance of exotic invasive species. In its native range, a species has co-evolved with pathogens, parasites, and predators that limit its population. When it arrives in a new territory, it leaves these old enemies behind, while those in its introduced range are less effective at constraining the introduced species' populations. The result is sometimes rampant growth that threatens native species and ecosystems.

== Explanations for invasive species' success ==
Ecologists have identified many potential reasons for the success of invasive species, including higher growth rates or seed production than native species, more aggressive dispersal, tolerance of environmental heterogeneity, more efficient use of resources, and phenological advantages such as an earlier or longer flowering season. Invasive species may have greater phenotypic plasticity in important traits than their native competitors, allowing them to tolerate more environmental variation, or exhibit the ability to evolve rapidly to adapt to their new conditions. In addition, some habitats, due to disturbances or other factors, may be more vulnerable to invasion than others. Most exotic species do not become invasive, and some authors suggest that those that do represent repeated and larger introductions that generate propagule pressure. Among the many explanations for invasive success, however, the enemy release hypothesis has had the most support.

== Applicability of the enemy release hypothesis ==
The enemy release hypothesis (ERH) is most often applied to invasive plants, but evidence exists for its usefulness in other systems, including fish, amphibians, insects, and crustaceans. The ERH assumes that: (1) herbivores, pathogens, and parasites suppress plant population growth, (2) these enemies plague native plants more than immigrating non-native species, and (3) non-native plants are able to leverage this advantage into more rapid population growth.

An early study of the flowering plant Silene latifolia found that about 60% of its invasive populations in North America were free from herbivory, while 84% of those in its native Europe exhibited damage from at least one herbivore. A study of almost 500 exotic plant species in the United States found that they were infected by 84% fewer fungi and 24% fewer virus species than in their native ranges. And a meta-analysis covering 15 exotic plant studies found the number of insect herbivores on average to be greater in their native than in their introduced range, with overall damage greater on native plants than on the introduced species.

Support for the theory, however, is not universal. In some cases, native pathogens, parasites and herbivores present significant biotic resistance to potential invasive species, as do non-native enemies that may have arrived prior to the exotic plant. Enemy release may be weaker, too, when an exotic species is more closely related to native species in their introduced ranges, making them more likely to share herbivores or pathogens. In a meta-analysis of 19 research studies involving 72 pairs of native and invasive plants, invasive exotic species did not incur less damage than their native counterparts and, in fact, exhibited lower relative growth rates. In other cases, invasive success was due not to release from herbivory but greater tolerance of it.

== Related theories ==
The ERH is closely related to two other important theories for invasive species success; the evolution of increased competitive ability (EICA) and novel weapons hypotheses (NWH). EICA asserts that because exotic plants are released from the burden of defending themselves against herbivores in their native range, they evolve to reallocate those resources to traits, such as growth and seed production, that make them more formidable competitors in their introduced range. ERH is an ecological mechanism, while EICA rests on evolutionary adaptation. The experimental support for EICA is mixed. For example, Solidago altissima plants artificially released from herbivory became more competitive against other plant species. However, a meta-analysis of 30 studies that found evidence of evolutionary shifts in introduced species, showed no indication of a trade-off between herbivore defenses and growth.

The novel weapons hypothesis (NWH) is another perspective on the enemy release hypothesis. Some plants evolve chemical defenses to compete in their original range. In their introduced range, the native species are highly vulnerable to these chemicals because they have no prior experience with them, giving the exotic species a competitive advantage.

== Practical applications ==
A final argument for the ERH lies in the success of biological control of some invasive species, in which herbivores or other enemies from their native environment are introduced to suppress population growth in their adopted range. For example, when conservationists sought to control the invasive St.-John's-wort (Hypericum perforatum) in North America, they imported a leaf herbivore (Chrysolina quadrigemina) from its native range in Europe.
