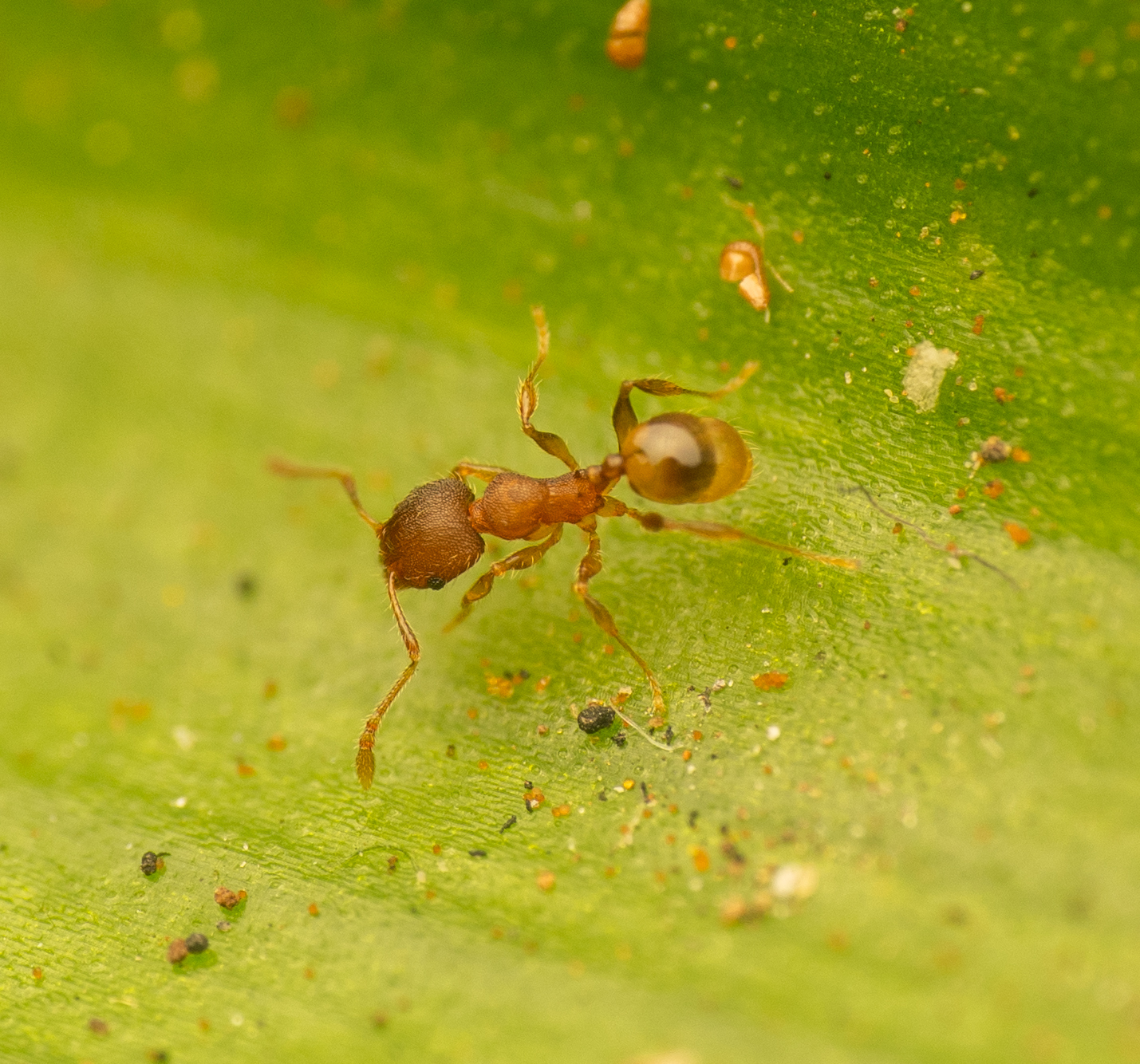
- P. navigans minor worker

Scientific classification
- Kingdom: Animalia
- Phylum: Arthropoda
- Clade: Pancrustacea
- Class: Insecta
- Order: Hymenoptera
- Family: Formicidae
- Subfamily: Myrmicinae
- Genus: Pheidole
- Species: P. navigans

Binomial name
- Pheidole navigans Forel, 1901

= Pheidole navigans =

Species of ant

Pheidole navigans, also called the navigating big-headed ant or the wandering big-headed ant, is a species of big-headed ant in the Pheidole flavens species group. Native to the Neotropics, it is a widespread invasive species, however its ecological impacts are not considered significant as of 2022. Prior to 2015, it was classified as a synonym of Pheidole flavens, and it was misidentified in its invasive range as Pheidole moerens. As with the vast majority of species within the genus Pheidole, they possess a dimorphic caste system with a major and minor worker. They are small reddish-brown ants not larger than 2.5 millimetres (0.098 in) with a generalist ecology and flexible nest preferences.

== Taxonomy ==
Pheidole navigans is traditionally considered to be part of the Pheidole flavens species group, a large assemblage of primarily Neotropical big-headed ants containing over 160 species characterized by small size, vestigial or absent mesosomal convexity, and 12-segmented antennae. However, the P. flavens group was not phylogenetically recovered to be monophyletic in 2015, and therefore the grouping appears largely artificial. P. navigans appears to be closely related to P. moerens and P. flavens sensu stricto, though, as a relatively basal clade of Pheidole as a whole. It was originally described as a subspecies of Pheidole flavens in 1901 by entomologist Auguste Forel, later fully synonymized under Pheidole flavens in 2003 by entomologist E. O. Wilson, and finally restored to full species status by Sarnat et al. in 2015. Its type locality is peculiar in that it is located in Germany, part of its introduced range, as an interception record from orchids originating from Veracruz, Mexico.

=== Identification ===
P. navigans is part of the subfamily Myrmicinae, which is characterized by a two-segmented waist consisting of a petiole and postpetiole, a fused promesonotum, the presence of frontal lobes over the antennal sockets, and generally triangular mandibles with a few exceptions. Within its subfamily, the genus is distinctly recognized by the presence of clearly dimorphic or rarely continuously polymorphic worker castes, a three- or four-segmented antennal club, and 12-segmented antennae except for two groups of small Neotropical Pheidole, the P. tachigaliae species group and P. perpusilla species group, with 11 and 10 antennal segments, respectively. In the Neotropical components of its genus, the P. flavens species group may be distinguished with a combination of 12-segmented antennae, a three-segmented antennal club, a medium to small size, an absent or vestigial mesosomal convexity, a relatively thick antennal club, a short scape, a moderately curved head shape, relatively shallow antennal scrobes, a lack of ladder-like transverse carinae on the head of the major worker, and a lack of cephalic phragmotism and a very short metanotum in the major worker. Their major workers may be separated from the closely related P. flavens and P. moerens by longitudinal rugae on the posterior lobes of the head, a longer, more distinct, and narrower antennal scrobe with a stronger and more continuous frontal carina, a more glossy scrobe depression, and transverse striae on the dorsal surface of the promesonotum. Their minor workers, however, are impossible to distinguish from other species in the P. flavens species complex.

== Morphology ==
Pheidole navigans is a small, reddish-brown to dark brown, short-limbed species, with minor workers reaching 2.0 millimetres (0.079 in), major workers 2.4 millimetres (0.094 in), males 2.8 millimetres (0.11 in), and queens 3.5 millimetres (0.14 in) in total body length. They are morphologically similar to a number of other species in the Pheidole flavens species group like Pheidole flavens, Pheidole glomericeps, and Pheidole moerens, leading to frequent misidentifications in their invasive range prior to 2015. Their color variation was suspected in 1985 to be caused by dietary variations, as colonies fed with honey and seeds developed lighter in color than colonies fed with houseflies. The queens of this species are small and blackish. Otherwise, they share most traits with other members of their species group and are morphologically unremarkable.

=== Castes ===
As with the vast majority of ants within the genus Pheidole, they have a dimorphic caste system consisting of major and minor workers. Minor workers are more versatile and more numerous and typically perform most of the tasks in the colony. In contrast, the more specialized major workers are mainly used for defense and food dissection, although they may occasionally venture out to forage. Minor workers have relatively normal appearances; however, major workers possess hypertrophied heads with powerful muscles. The minor workers allocate more space for the nervous system than major workers, suggesting they perform more complex tasks, while major workers tend to have more integrated brains than minor workers and more muscle mass in the head.

==== Minor worker ====
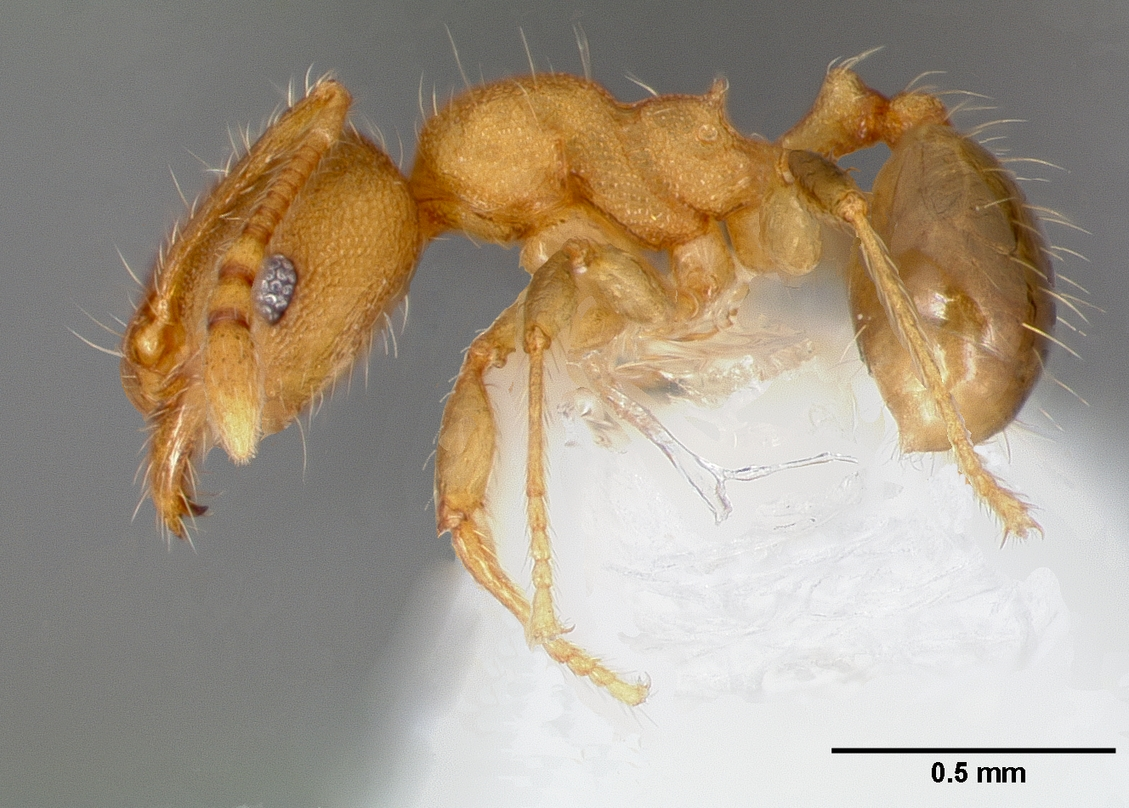
P. navigans AntWeb minor worker specimen

Minor workers of Pheidole navigans are small ants, approximately 1.5 to 2.0 millimeters long, with slender and compact bodies. They are typically reddish-brown to dark brown in color, with a slightly darker abdomen and lighter orange-brown legs. Their heads are slightly longer than they are wide. The eyes are small and set along the sides of the head, and the antennae are elbowed, ending in a short three-segmented club. Their triangular mandibles are equipped with six to seven small teeth used for general tasks like carrying food and working inside the nest. The body forms a smooth, gently curved profile, with small pointed spines near the rear of the thorax. The body is mostly covered in small pits and fine ridges called "foveolae." Like all members of its subfamily Myrmicinae, they have a narrow two-segment “waist” connecting the thorax to the abdomen. The abdomen itself is smooth and shiny, covered with fine hairs that usually point backward. Their sting is reduced and nonfunctional.

==== Major worker ====
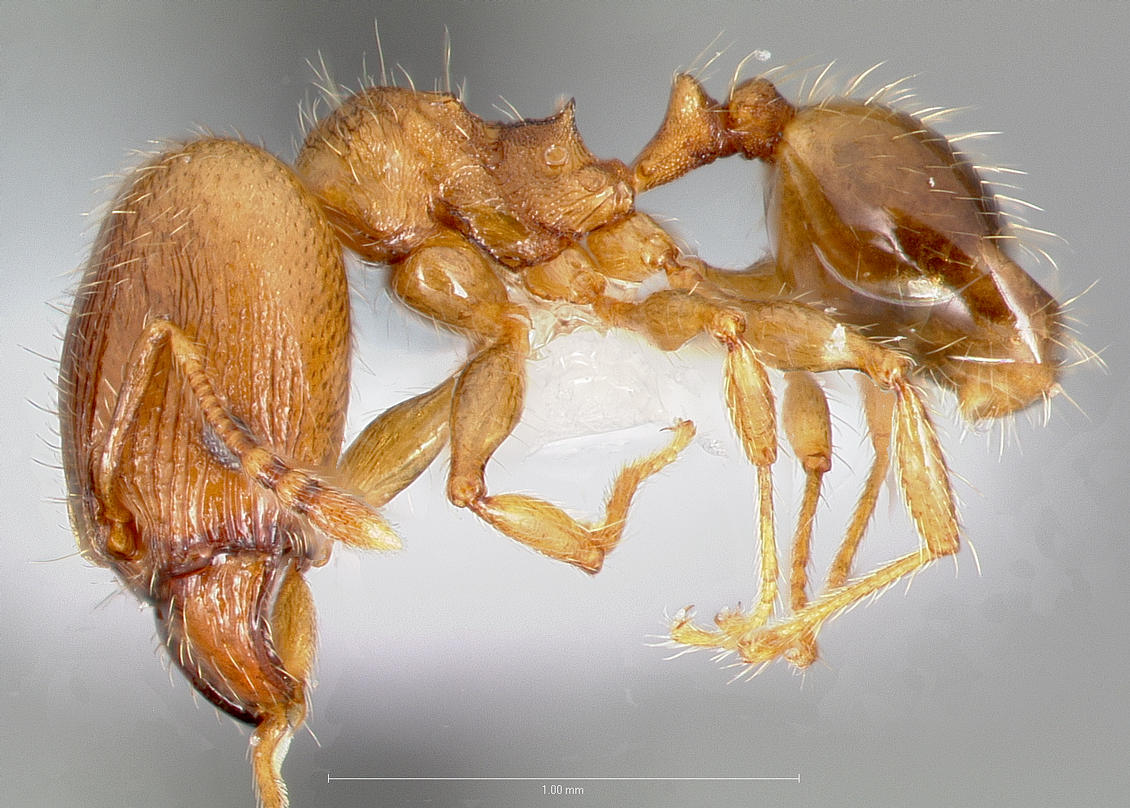
P. navigans AntWeb major worker specimen

Major workers are larger and more robust than minor workers, with the oversized heads that are typical of the genus Pheidole. Their heads are almost as wide as they are long and are deeply indented at the back, giving them a powerful appearance. Most of the head surface is covered in strong carinate ridges, while the rear corners are smooth and shiny. The body is dark reddish-brown, with a darker abdomen and lighter, orangish legs. Their triangular mandibles are large and muscular but have very few teeth. Underneath the head are several stout teeth that help anchor the head and jaws during biting. The body has stronger grooves and more pronounced spines than in minor workers, especially near the propodeum. As with the minors, the waist has two segments, and the abdomen is smooth and glossy. The sting is highly reduced and nonfunctional.

==== Queen ====
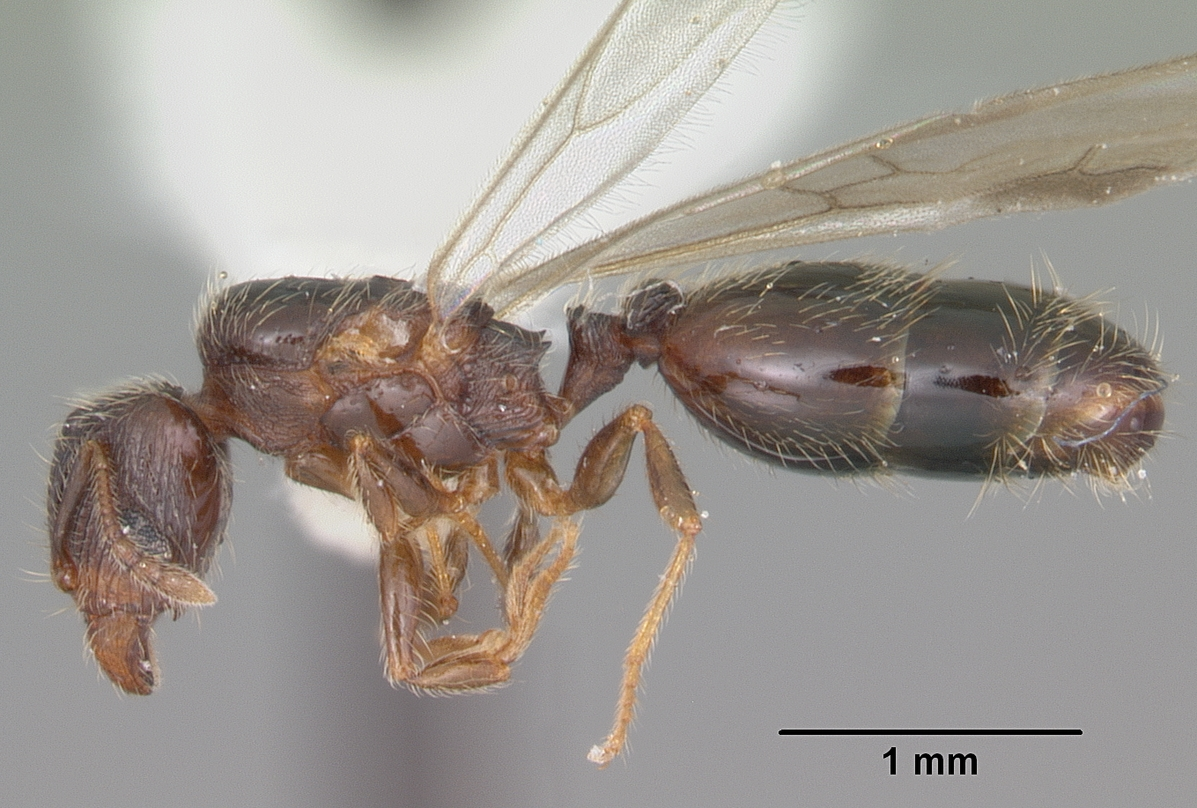
P. navigans AntWeb queen specimen

Queens are larger than workers and more robustly built. Their coloration is dark reddish-brown on the head, thorax, and waist, with a darker, nearly black abdomen and lighter, orange-brown legs. The head is slightly wider than long and broadly indented at the rear. Its surface is strongly sculptured with ridges and a network of fine grooves, while some areas between the ridges appear smooth and shiny. The eyes are large, and three simple ocelli are clearly visible on the top of the head. The antennae are elbowed with a three-segmented club, and the jaws are large and triangular, bearing only a single apical tooth. The thorax is large and flattened on top, with limited surface sculpturing compared to the head. The waist is thicker than in workers, consisting of two segments, and the abdomen is smooth, shiny, and covered with scattered flexible hairs. The sting is nonfunctional.

==== Male ====
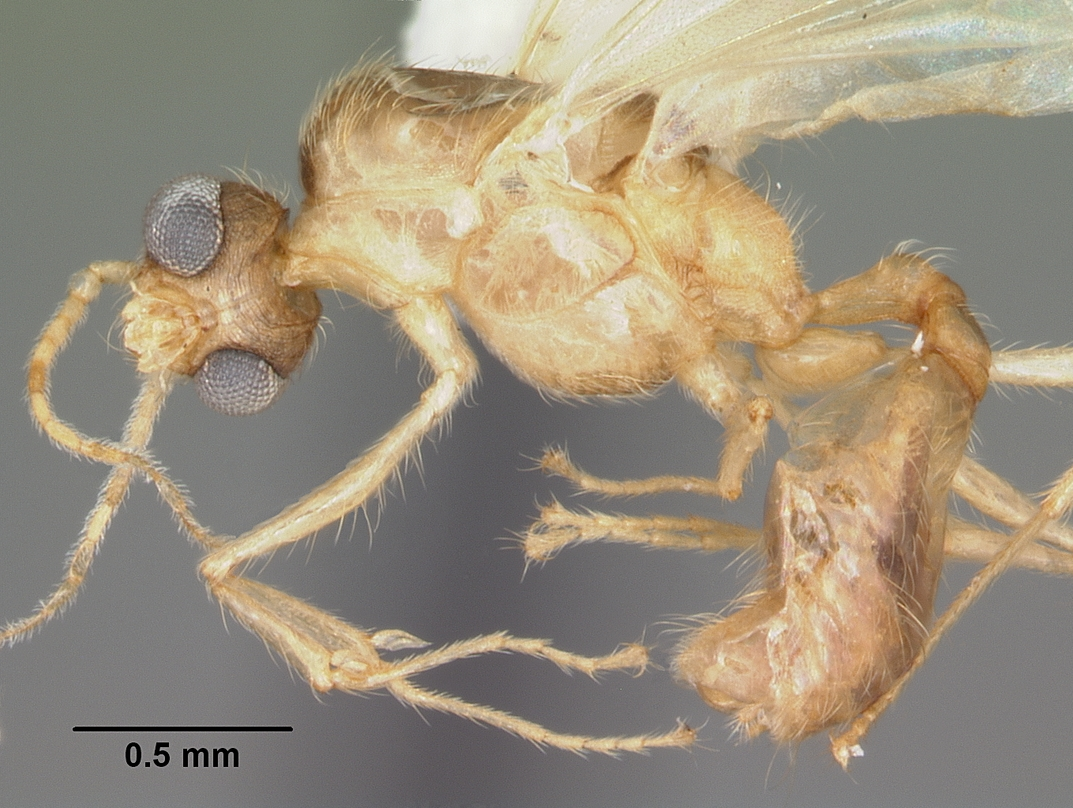
P. navigans AntWeb male specimen

Males are relatively small and slender, with a lighter overall appearance, and smaller than the queens. Their heads are dark brown, the thorax, waist, and abdomen are paler brown, and the legs and antennae are yellowish. The head is longer than wide and widest toward the rear. Its surface is covered in a tight pattern of ridges, with finer sculpturing near the front. The eyes are extremely large, occupying much of the head, and three prominent ocelli are present on the top of the head. The antennae are long, bead-like, and consist of thirteen segments. The thorax is smooth and shiny, shaped for flight, and bears short upright hairs. The waist is two-segmented and lightly sculptured, and the abdomen is smooth, glossy, and covered with erect hairs.

== Ecology ==
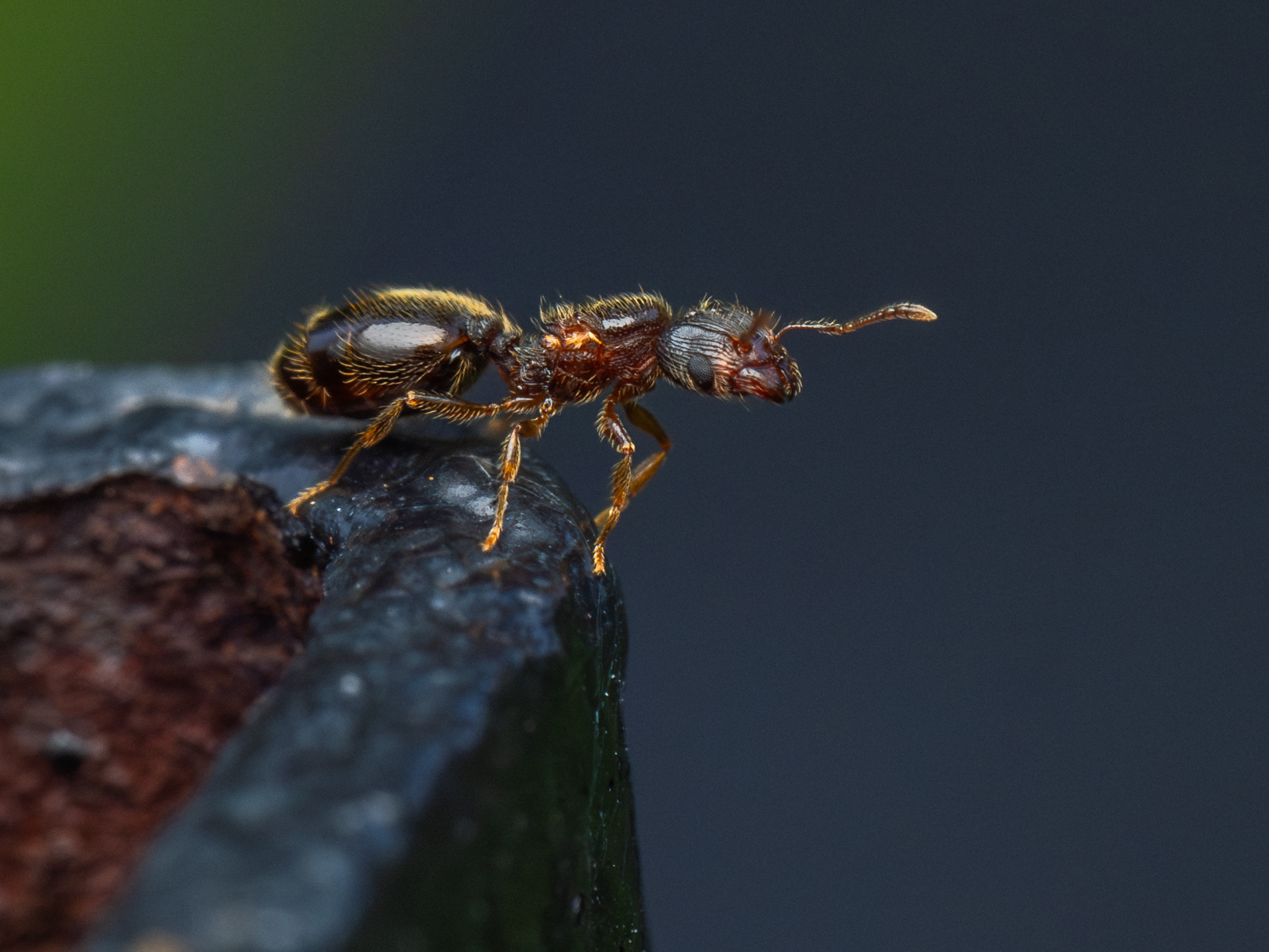
A P. navigans dealate queen found in Texas.

In Florida, they are rather common and nest in various microhabitats, including under boards, at the bases of fence posts and oak trees; in rotten wood, wall crevices, hollow twigs, nuts, leaf litter, and occasionally arboreally. They are rather generalist and consume a wide variety of foods, from small arthropods and seeds to sugars and human food. However, they are not reported to be major house pests. Mature colonies contain over 100 majors and 500 workers, while nuptial flights mostly occur in July. They are monogynous but undergo pleometrosis, in which multiple queens may cooperate to found a colony, yet only one survives past colony founding, and also practice dependent colony foundation, also termed budding, in which existing colonies split to form autonomous daughter groups, which separate to form new colonies. Their nest chambers have small openings and are built with soil and debris. Major workers often forage alongside workers, and foraging is done very close to the nest. They are attracted to both sugar and protein baits, and respond extremely quickly to tuna baits by recruiting both major and minor workers. Although they are widespread in Florida and other parts of the southeastern United States, their ecological effects are not well-known. In Florida, they appear to be partially successful in displacing their native congeners, Pheidole dentigula and Pheidole bilimeki. They may compete for space for nesting sites with native species in the southeastern United States, like those in the genera Aphaenogaster, Camponotus, Nylanderia, Solenopsis, Hypoponera, Strumigenys, Brachymyrmex, and others.

== Distribution ==
Pheidole navigans is native to the Neotropics and established as invasive in numerous regions like California, the southeastern United States, Madeira, Tenerife, Spain, Hawaii, and Vanuatu, however the species has possibly spread further since then. They were often misidentified in their invasive range, most notably as Pheidole moerens before 2015. They are classified as category D2 invasives, meaning that they are capable of surviving, reproducing, and sustaining a stable population in introduced regions. They are capable of exerting strong propagule pressure, appearing frequently in interception records worldwide. In their presumed native range, they have been recorded from Brazil, Colombia, Venezuela and Paraguay. They were first recorded as an established population outside of their native range in Alabama in 1967 and Florida in 1975, and have since been slowly expanding their range throughout the southeastern United States, later spreading to Georgia, Mississippi, North Carolina, and Texas by 2018. Elsewhere, they have spread to southern California by 1995, Hawaii by 2003, and Vanuatu in 2011. More recently, the species was first recorded in Madeira in 2014, where they may be successful in displacing other widespread invasive species in the region like Pheidole megacephala and Linepithema humile near the city of Funchal. In Bermuda, they were first recorded as an established population in 2016, although interception reports date back to 2004. The species was first recorded as an established population in the Canary Islands by 2020 in a farming area in the northern part of Tenerife and continental Europe in 2021, represented by a series of minor workers collected in Málaga, Spain.

=== Table ===
Established invasion history of Pheidole navigans
Region	Sub-region	First published record	Reference	Notes
Atlantic Islands	Bermuda	2016		
Atlantic Islands	Madeira	2014		
Atlantic Islands	Tenerife	2020		
Continental Europe	Spain	2021		
Eastern North America	Alabama	1967?		as P. moerens, exact date not specified
Eastern North America	Florida	1975?		as P. moerens, exact date not specified
Eastern North America	Georgia	2018		
Eastern North America	Louisiana	2002-2004		as P. moerens, exact date not specified
Eastern North America	Mississippi	2005		as P. moerens
Eastern North America	North Carolina	2006-2011		as P. moerens, exact date not specified
Eastern North America	Texas	2003?		as P. moerens, exact date not specified
Mexico	Hidalgo	1993?		exact date not specified
Mexico	Veracruz	1901		
Pacific Islands	Hawaii	2000		as P. moerens
Pacific Islands	Vanuatu	2011		as P. moerens
Western North America	California	1995		as P. moerens
