= Van Moerbeke =

van Moerbeke is a Dutch surname. Notable people with the surname include:

- Pierre van Moerbeke (born 1944), Belgian mathematician
- William of Moerbeke (1215–c. 1286), Latin translator
