= Ecological stability =

When an ecosystem does not drastically change over time even after perturbation

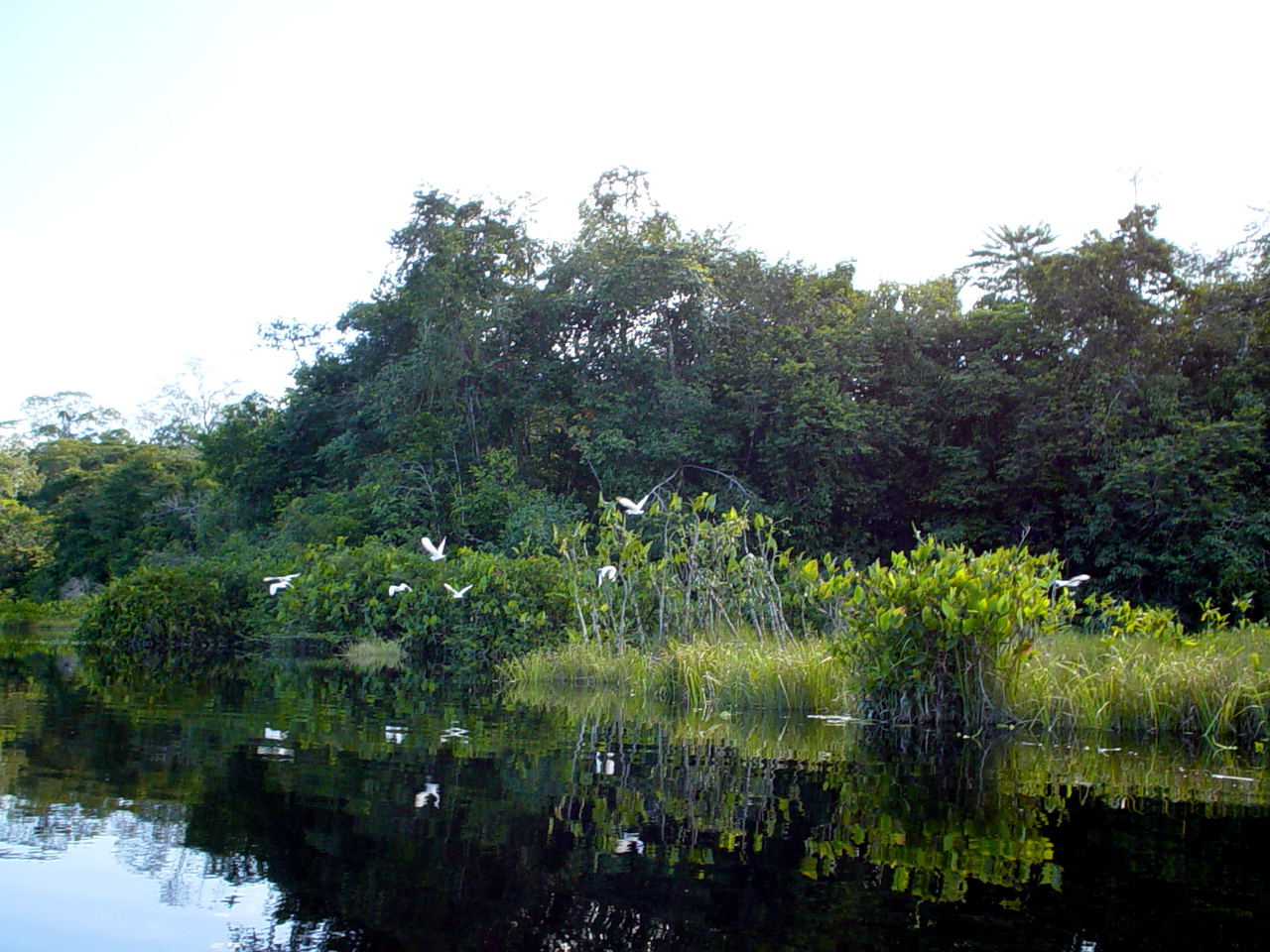
An example of ecological stability

In ecology, an ecosystem is said to possess ecological stability (or equilibrium) if it is capable of returning to its equilibrium state after a perturbation (a capacity known as resilience) or does not experience unexpected large changes in its characteristics across time. Although the terms community stability and ecological stability are sometimes used interchangeably, community stability refers only to the characteristics of communities. It is possible for an ecosystem or a community to be stable in some of their properties and unstable in others. For example, a vegetation community in response to a drought might conserve biomass but lose biodiversity.

Stable ecological systems abound in nature, and the scientific literature has documented them to a great extent. Scientific studies mainly describe grassland plant communities and microbial communities. Nevertheless, it is important to mention that not every community or ecosystem in nature is stable (for example, wolves and moose on Isle Royale). Also, noise plays an important role on biological systems and, in some scenarios, it can fully determine their temporal dynamics.

The concept of ecological stability emerged in the first half of the 20th century. With the advancement of theoretical ecology in the 1970s, the usage of the term has expanded to a wide variety of scenarios. This overuse of the term has led to controversy over its definition and implementation.

In 1997, Grimm and Wissel made an inventory of 167 definitions used in the literature and found 70 different stability concepts. One of the strategies that these two authors proposed to clarify the subject is to replace ecological stability with more specific terms, such as constancy, resilience and persistence. In order to fully describe and put meaning to a specific kind of stability, it must be looked at more carefully. Otherwise the statements made about stability will have little to no reliability because they would not have information to back up the claim. Following this strategy, an ecosystem which oscillates cyclically around a fixed point, such as the one delineated by the predator-prey equations, would be described as persistent and resilient, but not as constant. Some authors, however, see good reason for the abundance of definitions, because they reflect the extensive variety of real and mathematical systems.

== Stability analysis ==
When the species abundances of an ecological system are treated with a set of differential equations, it is possible to test for stability by linearizing the system at the equilibrium point. Robert May used this stability analysis in the 1970s which uses the Jacobian matrix or community matrix to investigate the relation between the diversity and stability of an ecosystem.

=== May stability analysis and random matrix theory ===
To analyze the stability of large ecosystems, May drew on ideas from statistical mechanics, including Eugene Wigner's work successfully predicting the properties of Uranium by assuming that its Hamiltonian could be approximated as a random matrix, leading to properties that were independent of the system's exact interactions. May considered an ecosystem with $S$ species with abundances $N_1,\ldots,N_S$ whose dynamics are governed by the couples system of ordinary differential equations,
$$\frac{\mathrm dN_i}{\mathrm d t} = g_i(N_1,\ldots,N_S),\qquad i = 1,\ldots,S.$$
Assuming the system had a fixed point, $N_1^\star,\ldots, N_S^\star$, May linearized dynamics as,
$$\frac{\mathrm d N_i}{\mathrm d t} = \sum_{j=1}^S J_{ij}(N_j - N_j^\star) ,\qquad i =1 ,\ldots,S.$$
The fixed point will be linearly stable if all the eigenvalues of the Jacobian, $J_{ij}$, are positive. The matrix $J$ is also known as the community matrix. May supposed that the Jacobian was a random matrix whose off-diagonal entries $J_{ij}\;(i\neq j)$ are all drawn as random variates from a probability distribution and whose diagonal elements $J_{ii}$ are all -1 so that each species inhibits its own growth and stability is guaranteed in the absence of inter-species interactions. According to Girko's circular law, when $S\gg 1$, the eigenvalues of $J$ are distributed in the complex plane uniformly in a circle whose radius is $\sqrt{S}\sigma$ and whose center is $-1$, where $\sigma$ is the standard deviation of the distribution for the off-diagonal elements of the Jacobian. Using this result, the eigenvalue with the largest real part contained in the support of the spectrum of $J$ is $-1+\sqrt{S}\sigma$. Therefore, the system will lose stability when,
$$\sqrt{S} > \frac{1}{\sigma}.$$
This result is known as the May stability criterion. It implies that dynamical stability is limited by diversity, and the strictness of this tradeoff is related to the magnitude of fluctuations in interactions.

Recent work has extended the approaches of May to construct phase diagrams for ecological models, like the generalized Lotka–Volterra model or consumer-resource models, with large complex communities with disordered interactions. This work has relied on uses and extensions of random matrix theory, the cavity method, the replica formalism, and other methods inspired by spin-glass physics.

== Types ==
Although the characteristics of any ecological system are susceptible to changes, during a defined period of time, some remain constant, oscillate, reach a fixed point or present other type of behavior that can be described as stable. This multitude of trends can be labeled by different types of ecological stability.

=== Dynamical stability ===
Dynamical stability refers to stability across time.

==== Stationary, stable, transient, and cyclic points ====
A stable point is such that a small perturbation of the system will be diminished and the system will come back to the original point. On the other hand, if a small perturbation is magnified, the stationary point is considered unstable.

==== Local and global stability ====
In the sense of perturbation amplitude, local stability indicates that a system is stable over small short-lived disturbances, while global stability indicates a system highly resistant to change in species composition and/or food web dynamics.

In the sense of spatial extension, local instability indicates stability in a limited region of the ecosystem, while global (or regional) stability involves the whole ecosystem (or a large part of it).

==== Species and community stability ====
Stability can be studied at the species or at the community level, with links between these levels.

==== Constancy ====
Observational studies of ecosystems use constancy to describe living systems that can remain unchanged.

=== Resistance and inertia (persistence) ===
Resistance and inertia deal with a system's inherent response to some perturbation.

A perturbation is any externally imposed change in conditions, usually happening in a short time period. Resistance is a measure of how little the variable of interest changes in response to external pressures. Inertia (or persistence) implies that the living system is able to resist external fluctuations. In the context of changing ecosystems in post-glacial North America, E.C. Pielou remarked at the outset of her overview,

"It obviously takes considerable time for mature vegetation to become established on newly exposed ice scoured rocks or glacial till...it also takes considerable time for whole ecosystems to change, with their numerous interdependent plant species, the habitats these create, and the animals that live in the habitats. Therefore, climatically caused fluctuations in ecological communities are a damped, smoothed-out version of the climatic fluctuations that cause them."

=== Resilience, elasticity and amplitude ===
Resilience is the tendency of a system to retain its functional and organizational structure and the ability to recover after a perturbation or disturbance. Resilience also expresses the need for persistence although from a management approach it is expressed to have a broad range of choices and events are to be looked at as uniformly distributed. Elasticity and amplitude are measures of resilience. Elasticity is the speed with which a system returns to its original/previous state. Amplitude measures how far a system can be moved from the previous state and still return. Ecology borrows the idea of neighborhood stability and a domain of attraction from dynamical system theory.

==== Lyapunov stability ====
Researchers applying mathematical models from system dynamics usually use Lyapunov stability.

==== Numerical stability ====
Focusing on the biotic components of an ecosystem, a population, or a community possesses numerical stability if the number of individuals is constant or resilient.

==== Sign stability ====
It is possible to determine if a system is stable just by looking at the signs in the interaction matrix.

== Stability and diversity ==
The relationship between diversity and stability has been widely studied. Diversity can enhance the stability of ecosystem functions at various ecological scales. For example, genetic diversity can enhance resistance to environmental perturbations. At the community level, the structure of food webs can affect stability. The effect of diversity on stability in food-web models can be either positive or negative, depending on the trophic coherence of the network. At the level of landscapes, environmental heterogeneity across locations has been shown to increase the stability of ecosystem functions. A stability diversity tradeoff has also been recently observed in microbial communities from human and sponge host environments. In the context of large and heterogeneous ecological networks, stability can be modeled using dynamic Jacobian ensembles. These show that scale and heterogeneity can stabilize specific states of the system in the face of environmental perturbations.

== History of the concept ==
The term 'oekology' was coined by Ernst Haeckel in 1866. Ecology as a science was developed further during the late 19th and the early 20th century, and increasing attention was directed toward the connection between diversity and stability. Frederic Clements and Henry Gleason contributed knowledge of community structure; among other things, these two scientists introduced the opposing ideas that a community can either reach a stable climax or that it is largely coincidental and variable. Charles Elton argued in 1958 that complex, diverse communities tended to be more stable. Robert MacArthur proposed a mathematical description of stability in the number of individuals in a food web in 1955. After much progress made with experimental studies in the 60's, Robert May advanced the field of theoretical ecology and refuted the idea that diversity begets stability. Many definitions of ecological stability have emerged in the last decades while the concept continues to gain attention.

== See also ==
- Dynamic equilibrium
- Ecological resilience
- Keystone species
- Principle of faunal succession
- Systems analysis
- Trophic coherence
- Random generalized Lotka–Volterra model
- Ecological release
