= EICA hypothesis =

Hypothesis in ecology

The evolution of increased competitive ability (EICA) hypothesis was first proposed by Bernd Blossey and Rolf Nötzold in 1995 as a way to explain the success of invasive, non-indigenous species (in particular, plants). Observing that:

1. there is usually a lag period between the time of introduction of an invasive species and the point at which it is considered invasive, and
2. invasive plants seem to be more virulent in habitats into which they have been introduced (as compared to their native habitats), the scientists presumed a sort of naturalization through modification for non-indigenous plants.

Because of a lack of native predation, the scientists reasoned, introduced plants are able to reallocate resources from defense mechanisms into growth and development. Introduced plants can thereby evolve to grow taller, produce more biomass, and yield more viable offspring than their native counterparts, according to the hypothesis.

Blossey and Nötzold tested their hypothesis on Lythrum salicaria (purple loosetrife) by potting seeds from plants growing in Ithaca, New York, U.S., and Lucelle, Switzerland. The seeds were allowed to germinate in a lab at Christian-Albrechts University in Kiel, northern Germany, and observed for two years. True to the predictions of the EICA Hypothesis, the plants derived from Ithaca produced significantly more biomass than the plants derived from Lucelle. The Lythrum salicaria plants derived from Ithaca also grew taller and were significantly less resistant to the root-feeding weevil present over its native range.

== Significance ==
Unlike the notable ideas (concerning the success of invasive non-indigenous organisms) that preceded it, such as the enemy release hypothesis (ERH) and Charles Darwin's Habituation Hypothesis, the EICA hypothesis postulates that an invasive species is not as fit (in its introduced habitat) at its moment of introduction as it is at the time that it is considered invasive. As suggested by the name of the hypothesis (Evolution of Increased Competitive Ability), the hypothesis predicts that much of the invasive potential of an invasive species is derived from its ability to evolve to reallocate its resources.

This idea is troubling in that it adds a new variable to "invasive potential", making it harder to predict whether or not a species will become invasive if it is introduced into a new area. In other words, the EICA hypothesis presents a new environmental safety concern. If its postulates hold, in the long run, introduced species may have to be more highly regulated than they are at present, because no set of traits or pattern of introduction can predict the extent to which an organism can reallocate its resources in response to a release from stress.

== Scientific support and revision ==
Since its debut in 1995, Bernd Blossey and Rolf Nötzold's paper, "Evolution of increased competitive ability in invasive nonindigenous plants: a hypothesis" has been met with varying degrees of enthusiasm. The paper has been cited over 1000 times as of September 2021 in scientific journals, including review articles, tests of the hypothesis using different model species, and expansions and reformulations of the hypothesis. Among the model species on which the hypothesis has been evaluated most recently (in its original form) are Solidago gigantea (giant goldenrod), Sapium sebiferum (Chinese Tallow), and Lepidium draba (whitetop). Of these three model species, the success and behavior of Sapium sebifurum agreed most closely with the postulates of the EICA Hypothesis, according to the researches conducting the study. In its study, the success and behavior of Solidago gigantea was only partially explained by the EICA hypothesis, according to its researchers. Lepidium draba did not seem to follow any of the postulates of the EICA Hypothesis, as the researchers of the study understood them.

Through most of the studies done on the EICA Hypothesis (see examples above), it holds that the introduced populations of invasive plant species are less able to cope with the pressures of specialist herbivores than native populations of the same species are, suggesting that invasive species do respond to accelerated natural selection after being released from the selective pressure of specialist herbivores and do have the potential to reallocate resources away from specific forms of defense. However, not all of these introduced populations produce significantly more biomass than the native populations of the same species under laboratory conditions. A study conducted by Bossdorf et al. in 2004 on Alliaria petiolata (garlic mustard) may lend some insight into this discrepancy. Bossdorf et al. potted seeds from native and introduced populations of Alliaria petiolata and put them in direct competition with one another in a laboratory setting (i.e. the native and introduced populations were grown in the same pot of soil, and subjected to the same treatments), and found that in direct competition, the native populations were able to out-compete the invasive populations. Bossdorf et al. proposed that this observation could result from the fact that there is a fitness cost to traits that increase so-called "competitive ability". Under this assumption, invasive populations of Alliaria petiolata had evolved a higher fitness (similar to Lythrum salicaria) in their introduced ranges at the cost of certain defense mechanisms and at the cost of certain aspects of growth and development (dissimilar to Lythrum salicaria). It could be, therefore, that the EICA Hypothesis is too narrow in scope, and should be reworded to place an emphasis on an invasive species' ability to reallocate its resources in order to procure a fitness advantage that may or may not involve more vigorous growth and development.
