= Generalized Lotka–Volterra equation =

Set of equations

The generalized Lotka–Volterra equations are a set of equations which are more general than either the competitive or predator–prey examples of Lotka–Volterra types. They can be used to model direct competition and trophic relationships between an arbitrary number of species. Their dynamics can be analysed analytically to some extent. This makes them useful as a theoretical tool for modeling food webs. However, they lack features of other ecological models such as predator preference and nonlinear functional responses, and they cannot be used to model mutualism without allowing indefinite population growth.

The generalised Lotka-Volterra equations model the dynamics of the populations $x_1, x_2, \dots$ of $n$ biological species. Together, these populations can be considered as a vector $\mathbf{x}$. They are a set of ordinary differential equations given by

$$\frac{dx_i}{dt} = x_i f_i(\mathbf{x}),$$

where the vector $\mathbf{f}$ is given by

$$\mathbf{f} = \mathbf{r} + A\mathbf{x},$$

where $\mathbf{r}$ is a vector and $A$ is a matrix known as the interaction matrix.

== Meaning of parameters ==
The generalised Lotka-Volterra equations can represent competition and predation, depending on the values of the parameters, as described below. "Generalized" means that all the combinations of pairs of signs for both species (−/−,−/+,+/-, +/+) are possible. They are less suitable for describing mutualism.

The values of $\mathbf{r}$ are the intrinsic birth or death rates of the species. A positive value for $r_i$ means that species i is able to reproduce in the absence of any other species (for instance, because it is a plant that is wind pollinated), whereas a negative value means that its population will decline unless the appropriate other species are present (e.g. a herbivore that cannot survive without plants to eat, or a predator that cannot persist without its prey).

The values of the elements of the interaction matrix $A$ represent the relationships between the species. The value of $a_{ij}$ represents the effect that species j has upon species i. The effect is proportional to the populations of both species, as well as to the value of $a_{ij}$. Thus, if both $a_{ij}$ and $a_{ji}$ are negative then the two species are said to be in direct competition with one another, since they each have a direct negative effect on the other's population. If $a_{ij}$ is positive but $a_{ji}$ is negative then species i is considered to be a predator (or parasite) on species j, since i's population grows at j's expense.

Positive values for both $a_{ij}$ and $a_{ji}$ would be considered mutualism. However, this is not often used in practice, because it can make it possible for both species' populations to grow indefinitely.

Indirect negative and positive effects are also possible. For example, if two predators eat the same prey then they compete indirectly, even though they might not have a direct competition term in the community matrix.

The diagonal terms $a_{ii}$ are usually taken to be negative (i.e. species i's population has a negative effect on itself). This self-limitation prevents populations from growing indefinitely.

== Dynamics and solutions ==
The generalised Lotka-Volterra equations are capable of a wide variety of dynamics, including limit cycles and chaos as well as point attractors (see Hofbauer and Sigmund). As with any set of ODEs, fixed points can be found by setting $dx_i/dt$ to 0 for all i, which gives, if no species is extinct, i.e., if $x_i \neq 0$ for all $i$,

$$\mathbf{x} = -A^{-1}\mathbf{r}.$$

This may or may not have positive values for all the $x_i$; if it does not, then there is no stable attractor for which the populations of all species are positive. If there is a fixed point with all positive populations the Jacobian matrix in a neighbourhood of the fixed point $\mathbf{x}$ is given by $\operatorname{diag}(\mathbf{x})A$. This matrix is known as the community matrix and its eigenvalues determine the stability of the fixed point $\mathbf{x}$. The fixed point may or may not be stable. If the fixed point is unstable then there may or may not be a periodic or chaotic attractor for which all the populations remain positive. In either case there can also be attractors for which some of the populations are zero and others are positive.

$\mathbf{x}=(0,0,\dots 0)$ is always a fixed point, corresponding to the absence of all species. For $n=2$ species, a complete classification of this dynamics, for all sign patterns of above coefficients, is available, which is based upon equivalence to the 3-type replicator equation.

== Applications for single trophic communities ==
In the case of a single trophic community, the trophic level below the one of the community (e.g. plants for a community of herbivore species), corresponding to the food required for individuals of a species i to thrive, is modeled through a parameter K_{i} known as the carrying capacity. E.g. suppose a mixture of crops involving S species. In this case $a_{ij}$ can be thus written in terms of a non-dimensional interaction coefficient $\hat{a}_{ij}$: $\hat{a}_{ij}=a_{ij}K_i/r_i$.

=== Quantitative prediction of species yields from monoculture and biculture experiments ===
A straightforward procedure to get the set of model parameters $\{K_i, \hat{a}_{ij}\}$ is to perform, until the equilibrium state is attained: a) the S single species or monoculture experiments, and from each of them to estimate the carrying capacities as the yield of the species i in monoculture $K_i = m_i^{ex}$ (the superscript 'ex' is to emphasize that this is an experimentally measured quantity a); b) the S´(S-1)/2 pairwise experiments producing the biculture yields, $x_{i(j)}^{ex}$ and $x_{j(i)}^{ex}$ (the subscripts i(j) and j(i) stand for the yield of species i in presence of species j and vice versa). We then can obtain $\hat{a}_{ij}$ and $\hat{a}_{ji}$, as: $\hat{a}_{ij} = (x_{i(j)}^{ex}-m_i^{ex})/x_{j(i)}^{ex}, \hat{a}_{ji}=(x_{j(i)}^{ex}-m_j^{ex})/x_{i(j)}^{ex}.$ Using this procedure it was observed that the Generalized Lotka–Volterra equations can predict with reasonable accuracy most of the species yields in mixtures of S >2 species for the majority of a set of 33 experimental treatments acrossdifferent taxa (algae, plants, protozoa, etc.).

=== Early warnings of species crashes ===
The vulnerability of species richness to several factors like, climate change, habitat fragmentation, resource exploitation, etc., poses a challenge to conservation biologists and agencies working to sustain the ecosystem services. Hence, there is a clear need for early warning indicators of species loss generated from empirical data.

A recently proposed early warning indicator of such population crashes uses effective estimation of the Lotka-Volterra interaction coefficients $\hat{a}_{ij}$. The idea is that such coefficients can be obtained from spatial distributions of individuals of the different species through Maximum Entropy. This method was tested against the data collected for trees by the Barro Colorado Island Research Station, comprising eight censuses performed every 5 years from 1981 to 2015. The main finding was that for those tree species that suffered steep population declines (of at least 50%), across the eight tree censuses, the drop of $\hat{a}_{ii}$ is always steeper and occurs before the drop of the corresponding species abundance N_{i} . Indeed, such sharp declines in $\hat{a}_{ii}$ occur between 5 and 15 years in advance than comparable declines for N_{i}, and thus they serve as early warnings of impending population busts.

== See also ==
- Competitive Lotka–Volterra equations, based on a sigmoidal population curve (i.e., it has a carrying capacity)
- Predator–prey Lotka–Volterra equations, based on exponential population growth (i.e., no limits on reproduction ability)
- Random generalized Lotka–Volterra model
- Consumer-resource model
- Community matrix
- Replicator equation
- Volterra lattice
