= Invasibility =

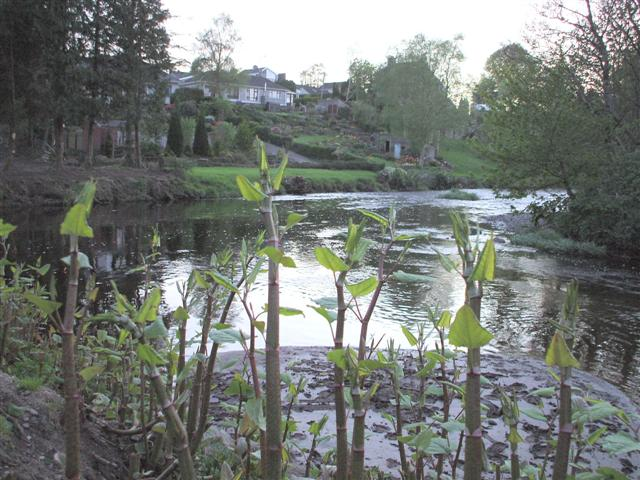
Invasive plants at Cranny, Omagh

Alien species, or species that are not native, invade habitats and alter ecosystems around the world. Invasive species are only considered invasive if they are able to survive and sustain themselves in their new environment. A habitat and the environment around it has natural flaws that make them vulnerable to invasive species. The level of vulnerability of a habitat to invasions from outside species is defined as its invasibility. One must be careful not to get this confused with invasiveness, which relates to the species itself and its ability to invade an ecosystem.

There are many factors, abiotic and biotic, that can impact habitat invasibility, such as stress, disturbance, nutrient levels, climate, and pre-existing native species. Typically invasive species favor areas that are nutrient-rich, have few environmental stresses, and high levels of disturbances. This explains why areas in the United States such as Hawaii, Florida, and California are infested with invasive species. These invasions are one of the biggest and most consistent threats to biodiversity across the globe. Antarctica is the only natural reserve on Earth that is without invasive species, due to its environmental factors.

== Ecological factors ==
=== Abiotic factors ===
Abiotic factors serve as the first filter of invasive species within a respective habitat. Invasive species are typically limited to habitats that are ecologically similar to their native habitats. The relative efficiency of invasibility is dependent on the abiotic niche being conserved over time or if the invader is able to adapt rapidly to their newly invaded abiotic niche. For example, the Asian shore crab (Hemigrapsus sanguineus) has almost identical abiotic niches in its native and invaded habitat but the European Green Crab (Carcinus maenas) has the ability to adapt its abiotic niche as it can survive in a wide range of water temperatures and salinities. Some invasions are only dependent on abiotic factors and not biotic factors. For example, the invasion of cordgrass (Spartina anglica) in salt marshes was highly dependent on salinity and sediment type and no biotic factors.

Propagule pressure is a composite measure of the number of individuals of a species released into a region to which they are not native. It has been found that species with weak dispersal agents create increased invasibility, especially near stream sides. The absence of habitat fragmentation allows for greater dispersal and high invasibility at edges of habitat boundaries. Propagule pressure is the main reason why the density of some invasive species is higher near the site of introduction.

Disturbance is another abiotic factor that can affect invasibility. Disturbance is defined as a punctuated event that kills organisms or removes part of their biomass. Both increasing and suppressing disturbances can increase invisibility. For example, in the North American grasslands fire was found to decrease invasion but increased grazing increased invasion. Fires increase the invasibility of some species of pine trees but decreases the invasibility of other pine species. It has been proposed that disturbances increase invasibility to the degree that they cause the natural habitat to deviate from its original state.

Stresses such as nutrient availability, water availability, light availability and extreme conditions affect invasibility. Low stress environments increase invasibility because the invaders are more likely to be able to take advantage of the increased resources. Addition of nutrients has been found to enhance the invasibility of an area. For example, when nutrients were added to an aquatic plankton environment it resulted in increased bacteria growth which facilitated the invasion of ciliates since the competition for resources was decreased. Also, nutrient addition to grasslands can have a variety of effects as it can shift species composition towards or away from a smaller number of relatively fast growing species, woody species such as annual herbs, perennial herbs, grasses or shrubs. Nutrient addition to a nutrient poor environment can not only promote invasions but can prompt the eventual dominance of non-native species within the habitat. Large scale nutrient addition can have a significant positive impact on invasibility. For example, large scale nutrient run-off in the New England area has caused the invasion of Phragmites australis an exotic vascular plant. Limiting nutrient resources has a negative impact on invasibility as resources will be limited increasing the competition between invasive and native species. For example, there is decreased water flow inside eelgrass habitats thus eelgrass limits the growth and survival of the invasive mussel (Musculista senhousia) This reduces the extent of its invasion compared to areas where eelgrass meadows are fragmented or absent. Stresses that limit metabolism or resource acquisition - such as extreme temperature and toxins - has the ability to both increase or decrease invasibility; this is dependent on the invader's characteristics. If the invader can live in a wider temperature range than the native species it will have a greater success rate. For example, an invasive C4 plant would have a better chance of surviving than a native C3 plant during a drought.

=== Biotic factors ===
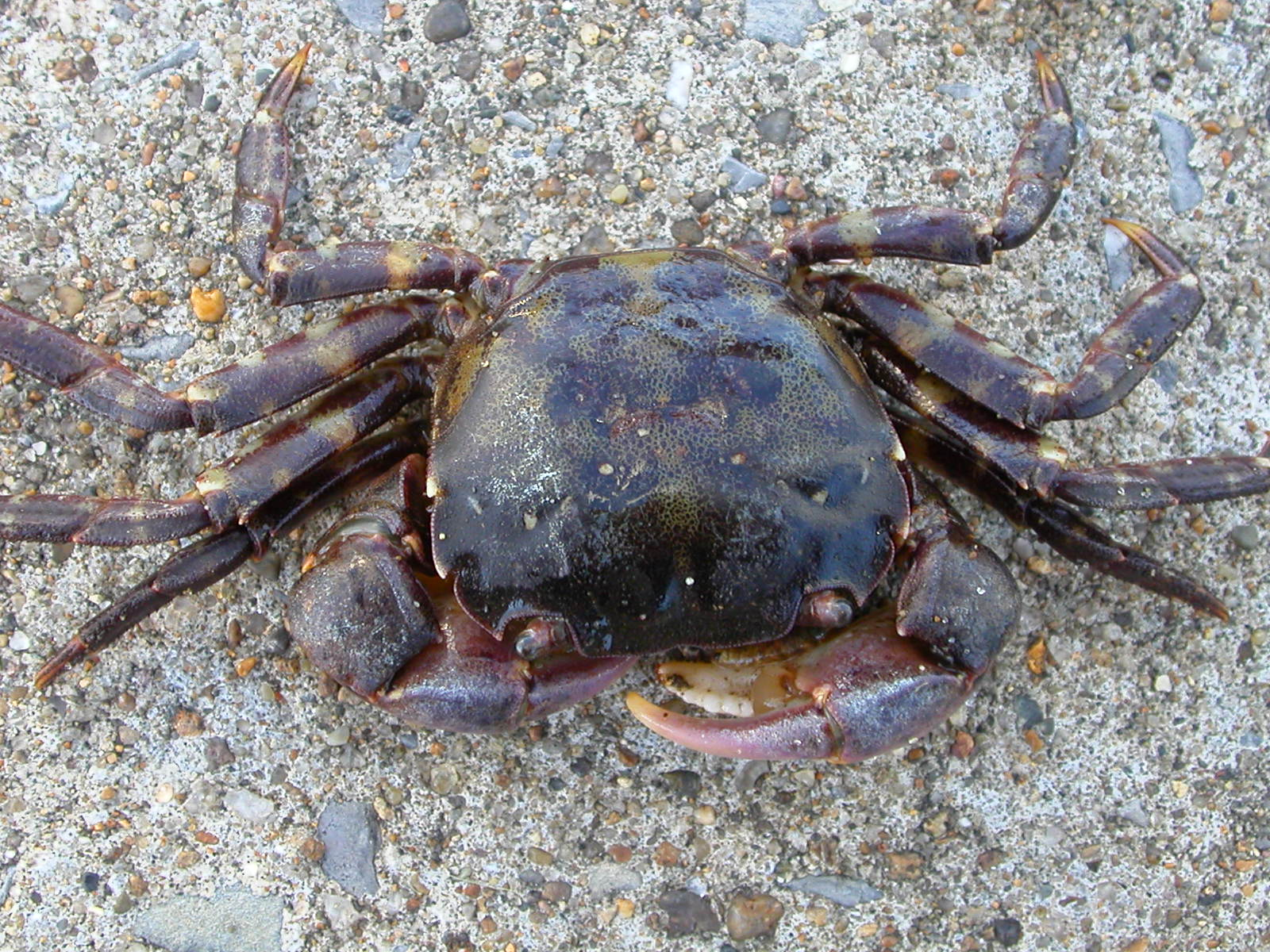
The Asian shore crab (Hemigrapsus sanguineus) invades shorelines around the world, especially in the New England area.

There are variety of biotic factors that influence invasibility such as competition, diversity, predation and disease. One of the main biotic factors that impact invasibility is interspecific competition. The invasibility of the recipient habitat or ecosystem is dependent on the structure of the resident ecological interaction network and is defined as the total width of an opportunity niche in the trait space susceptible to invasion. Since an invader will require certain limiting resources it will be more likely to be successful in habitat where competition for these resources is low. If the invader has optimum performance at a resource level that only slightly overlaps with a native species than it will have a greater chance invasion. For example, another reason the Asian shore crab (Hemigrapsus sanguineus) is such a successful invader in the New England area is because there are few ecological equivalents - that is to say, other grapsid crabs in the area. However, determining the success of a non-native species in its invaded habitat is not always easy because their resource requirements may differ from their native habitat. When the characteristics of a non-native species and native species are significantly similar a single native species can go a long way to prevent the invasion of a non-native species.

A habitat with high species diversity results in lower total resource availability thus decreasing the success of an invader. Diverse habitats also maintain stronger indirect interactions between species thus causing exclusion of non-native species that could out-compete a native species on a one-to-one level. A notable exception is diverse habitats with many pollinators. Pollinators significantly increase the invasion success of invasive plants thus habitats with a diverse set of pollinators have a greater chance of being invaded.

== Habitats with high invasibility ==
Certain habitats are naturally more susceptible to alien plant invasions. Invasive plants tend to thrive in nutrient-rich and man-made habitats. The most commonly invaded types of habitats include those that are man made, such as gardens, farmlands, urban landscapes, ecosystems with nutrient rich fertile soil, such as forestry plantations and forest clearings, or areas of high levels of disturbance, such as coastal and riparian habitats. Habitats with high levels of disturbance are much more likely to be invaded by a non-native species. In order for successful invasion of a natural community to occur, it requires dispersal, establishment, and survival.

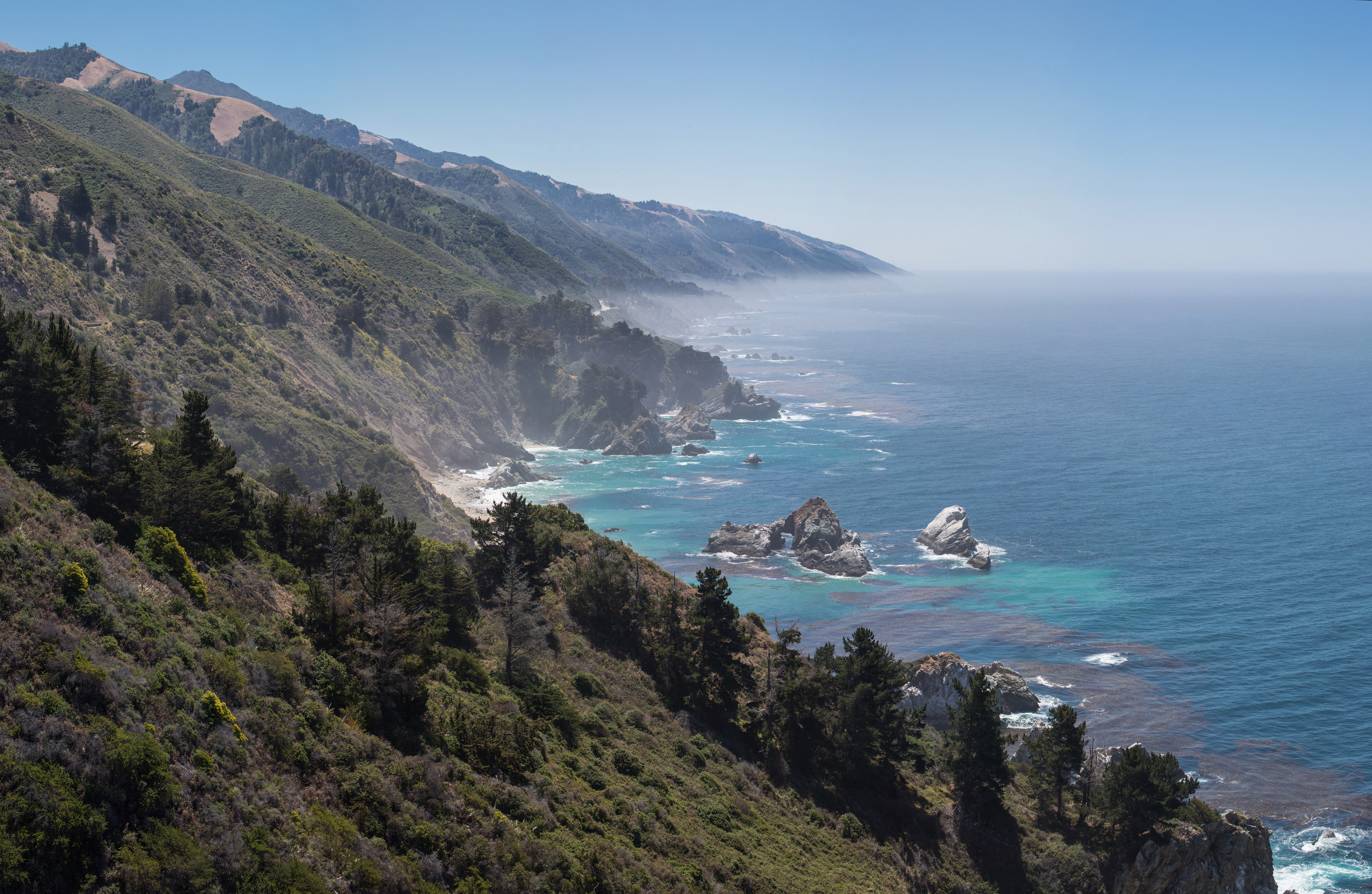
Central Californian coastline, Big Sur, May 2013

The specific ecosystems in the United States that are among the most heavily invaded are located in Hawaii, Florida, and California. Specifically, the grasslands and valleys of California have been so heavily invaded by non-native species, that this habitat has been completely altered, and the original habitat composition and structure are not known because of how different it is now. In this same region, the southwest piñon-juniper woodlands have only experienced light habitat invasion from non-natives. It was also found that large oceanic bays such as the Chesapeake Bay in Virginia and Maryland and the San Francisco bay in California now contain more non-native species than native species that the habitat originated with. However, the worst of all in the United States is Hawaii. The island state is the most heavily invaded region in the country. Over the years, over 38 land birds, 18 exotic mammals, 17 exotic reptiles, 38 exotic land mollusks, and 19 exotic freshwater fish have all been successfully introduced to Hawaii, increasing the number; 4,598 exotic species established in the wild. For a small area of a few islands, these are huge numbers, which have very significantly affected the overall ecosystem on the island.

== Habitats with low invasibility ==
Levels of species invasion are low in harsh climates and habitats with poor nutrients. These habitats include mountains, cliffs, bogs, dry grasslands and coniferous woodlands, deserts, and savannas. Non-native plants and animals do not tend to thrive in these types of habitats due to the lack of nutrient availability, harsh climatic conditions, or other unfavorable conditions that diminish the quality of life of a foreign species.

A good example of an area that expresses low invasibility would be the Mojave Desert located in Southern California. The climate here is classified as an arid desert with low soil nutrients and low diversity of species, because the typical resources that common species need in order to stay alive are not readily available in desert habitat conditions. It is extremely hard for any new non-native species to invade this area and live to reproduce. (However, on the other hand "Because overall levels of soil nutrients in the Mojave Desert are low relative to other ecosystems, the high nutrient concentrations that produce high cover of competitive natives that hinders the establishment and growth of aliens may never be found in this region.") New species are less likely to be able to establish themselves in harsh climate areas, or communities that are abiotically stressful.
