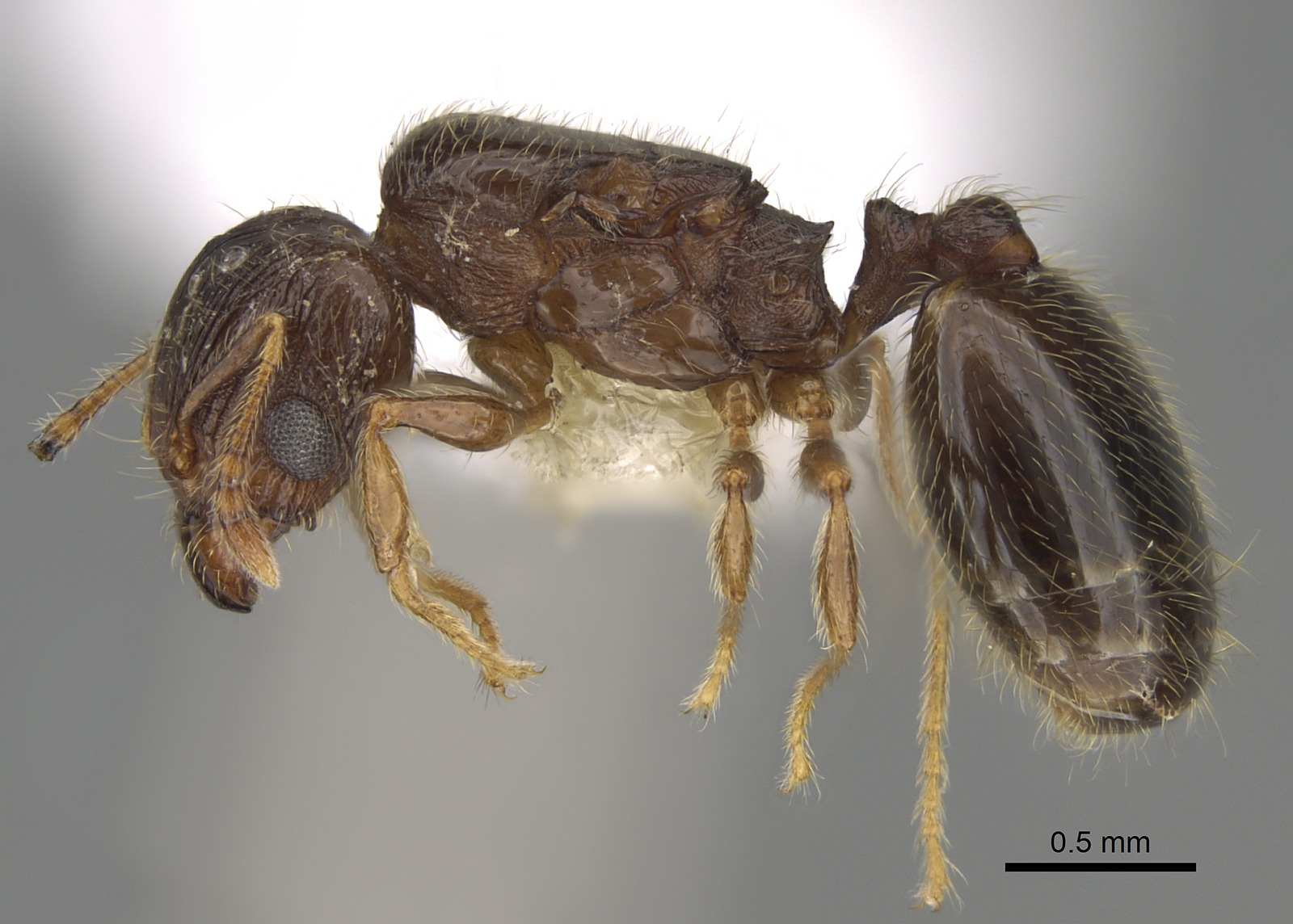

Scientific classification
- Kingdom: Animalia
- Phylum: Arthropoda
- Class: Insecta
- Order: Hymenoptera
- Family: Formicidae
- Subfamily: Myrmicinae
- Tribe: Attini
- Genus: Pheidole
- Species: P. moerens

Binomial name
- Pheidole moerens Wheeler, 1908

= Pheidole moerens =

Species of ant

Pheidole moerens is a species of big-headed ant described by myrmecologist William Morton Wheeler in 1908.

This species of ant is native to Venezuela and the Caribbean Islands. It previously contained three subspecies, however, all three were synonymized under the parent taxon by Wilson, 2003. It was originally thought to be invasive in California, the southeastern United States, and Hawaii, however those populations were later found to be a different species, Pheidole navigans.
