= Propagule =

Biological material that propagates an organism to the next life cycle stage

In biology, a propagule is any material that functions in propagating an organism to the next stage in its life cycle, such as by dispersal. The propagule is usually distinct in form from the parent organism. Propagules are produced by organisms such as plants (in the form of seeds or spores), fungi (in the form of spores), and bacteria (for example endospores or microbial cysts).

In disease biology, pathogens are said to generate infectious propagules, the units that transmit a disease. These can refer to bacteria, viruses, fungi, or protists, and can be contained within host material. For instance, for influenza, the infectious propagules are carried in droplets of host saliva or mucus that are expelled during coughing or sneezing.

In horticulture, a propagule is any plant material used for the purpose of plant propagation. In asexual reproduction, a propagule is often a stem cutting. In some plants, a leaf section or a portion of root can be used. In sexual reproduction, a propagule is a seed or spore. In micropropagation, a type of asexual reproduction, any part of the plant may be used, though it is usually a highly meristematic part such as root and stem ends or buds.

== See also ==
- Disseminule
- Gemma (botany)
- Plantlet
- Propagule pressure
- Seed dispersal
