= Volterra lattice =

In mathematics, the Volterra lattice, also known as the discrete KdV equation, the Kac–van Moerbeke lattice, and the Langmuir lattice, is a system of ordinary differential equations with variables indexed by some of the points of a 1-dimensional lattice. It was introduced by Marc Kac and Pierre van Moerbeke (1975) and Jürgen Moser (1975) and is named after Vito Volterra. The Volterra lattice is a special case of the generalized Lotka–Volterra equation describing predator–prey interactions, for a sequence of species with each species preying on the next in the sequence. The Volterra lattice also behaves like a discrete version of the KdV equation. The Volterra lattice is an integrable system, and is related to the Toda lattice. It is also used as a model for Langmuir waves in plasmas.

== Definition ==
The Volterra lattice is the set of ordinary differential equations for functions a_{n}:

$$a_n'=a_n(a_{n+1}-a_{n-1})$$

where n is an integer. Usually one adds boundary conditions: for example, the functions a_{n} could be periodic: a_{n} = a_{n+N} for some N, or could vanish for n ≤ 0 and n ≥ N.

The Volterra lattice was originally stated in terms of the variables R_{n} = -log a_{n} in which case the equations are

$$R_n'=e^{R_{n-1}}-e^{R_{n+1}}$$
