= Eelgrass =

Eelgrass is a common name for several plants and may refer to:

- Zostera, marine eelgrass
- Vallisneria, freshwater eelgrass

== See also ==
- Potamogeton compressus, known as eel-grass pondweed
