= Pierre van Moerbeke =

Belgian mathematician (born 1944)

Pierre van Moerbeke (born 1 October 1944 in Leuven, Belgium) is a retired Belgian mathematician. He studies non-linear differential equations and partial differential equations, with soliton behavior. The Volterra lattice, also called the Kac-van Moerbeke lattice, is named for him.

== Education and career ==
Van Moerbeke studied mathematics at the Catholic University of Leuven, where he received his degree in 1966. He then obtained a PhD in mathematics at Rockefeller University, New York City (1972). Formerly a professor of mathematics at Brandeis University (United States) and the Catholic University of Leuven, he has retired to become a professor emeritus at Brandeis.

== Recognition ==
In 1988, he was awarded the Francqui Prize on Exact Sciences.
