= Community matrix =

In mathematical biology, the community matrix is the linearization of a generalized Lotka–Volterra equation at an equilibrium point. The eigenvalues of the community matrix determine the stability of the equilibrium point.

For example, the Lotka–Volterra predator–prey model is

$$\begin{array}{rcl}
\dfrac{dx}{dt} &=& x(\alpha - \beta y) \\
\dfrac{dy}{dt} &=& - y(\gamma - \delta x),
\end{array}$$

where x(t) denotes the number of prey, y(t) the number of predators, and α, β, γ and δ are constants. By the Hartman–Grobman theorem the non-linear system is topologically equivalent to a linearization of the system about an equilibrium point (x*, y*), which has the form

$$\begin{bmatrix} \frac{du}{dt} \\ \frac{dv}{dt} \end{bmatrix} = \mathbf{A} \begin{bmatrix} u \\ v \end{bmatrix},$$

where u = x − x* and v = y − y*. In mathematical biology, the Jacobian matrix $\mathbf{A}$ evaluated at the equilibrium point (x*, y*) is called the community matrix. By the stable manifold theorem, if one or both eigenvalues of $\mathbf{A}$ have positive real part then the equilibrium is unstable, but if all eigenvalues have negative real part then it is stable.

== See also ==
- Paradox of enrichment
