= Propagule pressure =

Measure of the quantity of an introduced species

Propagule pressure (also termed introduction effort) is a composite measure of the number of individuals of a species released into a region to which they are not native. It incorporates estimates of the absolute number of individuals involved in any one release event (propagule size) and the number of discrete release events (propagule number). As the number of releases or the number of individuals released increases, propagule pressure also increases. Propagule pressure can be defined as the quality, quantity, and frequency of invading organisms (Groom, 2006). Propagule pressure is a key element to why some introduced species persist while others do not (Lockwood, 2005). Species introduced in large quantities and consistent quantities prove more likely to survive, whereas species introduced in small numbers with only a few release events are more likely to go extinct (Lockwood, 2005). Propagule pressure is a composite measure to the number of individuals released into a non-native region (Lockwood, 2005). Three approaches are used to study and measure propagule pressure. One approach introduces a specific amount of propagules into controlled plots. A second approach allows introduced species to mature and colonize naturally while observing native and non-native species during the colonization. The final approach used to study and measure propagule pressure utilizes records of the numbers of individuals introduced, including natural introductions and intentional introductions (Colautti et al., 2003).

== History ==
Propagule pressure plays an important role in species invasions (Groom, 2006). Charles Darwin was the first to study specific factors related to invasions of non-native species. In his research he identified that few members of the same genus were present in habitats containing naturalized non-indigenous species (Colautti et al., 2006). His research showed that the number of nonnative species varied from habitat to habitat. Later, it was suggested that the niche theory and biotic resistance help explain the variation in success or failure of nonnative invasion (Colautti et al., 2006). More recent studies have shown that particular invasive species characteristics, such as ability to compete for resources, aid in their proliferation in habitats. A study noted by Colautti showed the correlation between propagule pressure and invasion success (2006). Without propagule pressure the number of invasive species incorporated would be unpredictable. It has been shown that species successfulness is frequently attributed to propagules (Colautti et al., 2006).

== Concepts ==
One important concept of propagule pressure is how it can be used to predict and or prevent invasions of non-native species in high risk locations. As invasion rates increase and biodiversity decreases, the probability of non-native establishment needs to be more accurately measured (Leung et al., 2004). Once estimation rates of species invasion success are better known, prevention efforts can be better implemented (Leung et al., 2004). To properly understand propagule pressure it is also important to realize that it is actually in flux within nature. In general, the probability of establishment will always be higher whenever propagule pressure is higher (Leung et al., 2004). If pressure is extremely low it is likely that the species' population will be too small to detect. When this is the case detailed information on rates of population introduction and size are difficult to obtain (Leung et al., 2004).

In most studies where a direct relationship is observed, the higher the propagule pressure, the higher the success of the invasion. It is worthy to note, though, that in Britton-Simmons and Abbott's study (2008) of the successfulness of seaweed establishment in marine algal communities, propagule pressure was not sufficient to maximize invasion success. They found that resource availability had to coincide with invasion time and was a limiting factor to seaweed success (Britton-Simmons et al., 2008).

== Influencing factors ==
There are several factors that influence propagule pressure. They include size and frequency of the initial invasion, the pathway of invasion, characteristics of the species involved and the rate of the immigration (Groom, 2006). When studying propagule pressure one must ask the question; do these factors affect persistence independently or interact together? (Leung et al., 2004) The dynamics of the invasion are influenced by propagule pressure even after establishment has taken place. The carrying capacity of the nonnative species remains variable while adapting to their new environment.

== Case studies ==
One particular study conducted by Robert I. Colautti et al. (2006), proposes that propagule pressure should act as a null model for studies that consider/compare processes of invasions to patterns of invasions. This study was a meta-analysis studying the characteristics of invasiveness and invasibility. The group researched the impact of thirteen invasiveness characteristics, and seven invasibility characteristics. Of the invasiveness characteristics studied, most did not significantly correlate to establishment, spread, abundance or impact of nonindigenous species. Propagule pressure, however, was shown to be a key contributor to both invasiveness and invasibility. This study found there was a positive association between establishment and propagule pressure. In regards to predicting invasions, it was found that propagule pressure was significantly associated with invasion successes and of the inclination of a habitat to be invaded. Of the thirteen other invasiveness characteristics studied, only three were significantly (positively or negatively) associated with invasiveness. Likewise, only two of the other six invasibility characteristics were shown to be significant. The communities that experienced more disturbances and resource availability achieved higher establishment and abundance of invaders.

== Impacts ==
Species characteristics, environmental characteristics, and human involvement affect invasion pathways and thus have an effect on propagule pressure and the success or failure of attempted invasions. For native species of conservation concern such as endangered species, propagule pressure can be used to ensure successful introductions of populations in the wild. On a similar note, propagule pressure also plays a role in unintentional invasions of nonnative species to particular habitats. Once propagule pressure is considered, more suitable measures can be taken to reverse the unwanted effects of nonnative invasions. This tool can be used for positive effects for desired species (Groom et al. 2006).

== Measurement ==
The total probability of establishment (E) can be determined using this equation. It considers that each propagule has an independent chance of establishment:

$E(Nl,t) = 1 - (1 - p)Nl,t$

(E) is the total probability of establishment, (p) is the probability of a single propagule establishing, (N) is the number of propagules arriving at a specific location at a certain time, (l) is the location, (t) is the time.

- The equation can also be written as the standard asymptotic curve (sometimes termed the independence model):

$E(Nl,t ) = 1 - e2<small>-</small>(aNl,t)$

Alpha=shape coefficient which is equivalent to −ln(l − p).

Measures of propagule pressure have been shown to have specific relationships with the probability of establishment (Leung et al. 2004).
