= Paradox of enrichment =

Paradox coined by Michael Rosenzweig

In population ecology, the paradox of enrichment is the idea that increasing the food available to a prey species can cause the predator's population to destabilize. The term was coined by Michael Rosenzweig in 1971, where he described an effect in six predator–prey models. A common example is that if the food supply of a prey such as a rabbit is overabundant, its population will grow unbounded and cause the predator population (such as a lynx) to grow unsustainably large. That may result in a crash in the population of the predators and possibly lead to local eradication or even species extinction.

The term 'paradox' has been used since then to describe this effect in slightly conflicting ways. The original sense was one of irony; by attempting to increase the prey carrying capacity in an ecosystem, the enriched environment can destabilise the biological populations. Since then, some authors have used the word to describe the difference between modelled and real predator–prey interactions.

Rosenzweig used ordinary differential equation models to describe changes in prey populations. Enrichment was taken to be an increase in the prey's carrying capacity, which can can render the equilibrium unstable, usually resulting in a limit cycle.

The cycling behavior after destabilization was more thoroughly explored in a subsequent paper (May 1972) and discussion (Gilpin and Rosenzweig 1972).

== Support and possible solutions to the paradox ==
Many studies have been done on the paradox of enrichment since Rosenzweig. There is empirical support for the paradox of enrichment, mainly from small scale laboratory experiments, but limited support from field observations. Roy and Chattopadhyay list a number of mechanism for which the destabilisation need not occur:

- Inedible prey: if there are multiple prey species and not all are edible, some may absorb nutrients and stabilise cyclicity.
- Invulnerable prey: even with a single prey species, if there is a degree of temporal or spatial refuge (the prey can hide from the predator), destabilisation may not happen.
- Unpalatable prey: if prey do not fulfil the nutritional preferences of the predator to as great an extent at higher densities, as with some algae and grazers, there may be a stabilising effect.
- Ratio dependent functional response. The presence of the paradox depends on the assumption of the prey dependence of the functional response. The Arditi–Ginzburg model, which uses a ratio-dependent functional response, does not show destabilisation.
- Spatial interactions or spatio-temporal chaos. The model for enrichment assumes that there is no spatial heterogeneity. Spatial versions of predator-prey models allow for spatial heterogeneity of predator and prey populations in different locations to build up, which can reduce the violent oscillations of the non-spatial model. If a spatiotemporally chaotic, heterogeneous environment is introduced, cyclic patterns may not arise.
- Inducible defense: if there is a predation-dependent response from prey species, it may act to decelerate the downward swing of population caused by the boom in predator population. An example is of Daphnia and fish predators.
- Density dependent predator mortality: if the predator density cannot increase in proportion to that of the prey, destabilising periodicities may not develop.
- Prey toxicity: if there is a significant cost to the predator of consuming the (now very dense) prey species, predator numbers may not increase sufficiently to give periodicity.

== Link with Hopf bifurcation ==
The paradox of enrichment can be accounted for by bifurcation theory. As the carrying capacity increases, the equilibrium of the dynamical system becomes unstable.

The bifurcation can be obtained by modifying the Lotka–Volterra equation. First, one assumes that the growth of the prey population is determined by the logistic equation. Then, one assumes that predators have a nonlinear functional response, typically of type II. The saturation in consumption may be caused by the time to handle the prey or satiety effects.

Thus, one can write the following (normalized) equations:

$$\frac{dx}{dt} = x\left(1 - \frac{x}{K}\right) - y \frac{x}{1 + x}$$

$$\frac{dy}{dt} = \delta y \frac{x}{1 + x} - \gamma y$$

- x is the prey density;
- y is the predator density;
- K is the prey population's carrying capacity;
- γ and δ are predator population's parameters (rate of decay and benefits of consumption, respectively).

The term $x\left(1 - \frac{x}{K}\right)$ represents the prey's logistic growth and $\frac{x}{1 + x}$ the predator's functional response.

The prey isoclines (points at which the prey population does not change, i.e. dx/dt = 0) are easily obtained as $\ x = 0$ and $y = (1 + x) \left(1 - x/K \right)$. Likewise, the predator isoclines are obtained as $\ y = 0$ and $x = \frac{\alpha}{1-\alpha}$, where $\alpha = \frac{\gamma}{\delta}$. The intersections of the isoclines yield three steady states:

$$x_1 = 0,\; y_1 = 0$$

$$x_2 = K,\; y_2 = 0$$

$$x_3 = \frac{\alpha}{1-\alpha},\; y_3 = (1 + x_3) \left(1 - \frac{x_3}{K}\right)$$

The first steady-state corresponds to the extinction of both predator and prey, the second one to the predator-free steady-state, and the third to co-existence, which only exists when $\alpha$ is sufficiently small. The predator-free steady-state is locally linearly unstable if and only if the coexistence steady-state exists.

By the Hartman–Grobman theorem, one can determine the stability of the steady states by approximating the nonlinear system by a linear system. After differentiating each $f$ and $g$ with respect to $x$ and $y$ in a neighborhood of $(x_3, y_3)$, we get:

$$\frac{d}{dt}\begin{bmatrix}x - x_3\\y - y_3\\\end{bmatrix} \approx \begin{bmatrix}\alpha\left( 1 - (1 + 2 x_3)/K \right)&- \alpha\\ \delta (1 - \alpha)^2 y_3 & 0\\\end{bmatrix} \begin{bmatrix}x - x_3\\y - y_3\\\end{bmatrix}$$

It is possible to determine the exact solution of this linear system, but here, the only interest is in the qualitative behavior. If both eigenvalues of the community matrix have negative real parts, then by the stable manifold theorem the system converges to a limit point. Since the determinant is equal to the product of the eigenvalues and is positive, both eigenvalues have the same sign. Since the trace is equal to the sum of the eigenvalues, the co-existence steady-state is locally linearly stable if

$$\alpha\left(1 - \frac{1+2x_3}{K}\right) < 0, \text{ or } K < 1 + 2\frac{\alpha}{1-\alpha}$$

At that critical value of the parameter K, the system undergoes a Hopf bifurcation. It comes as counterintuitive (hence the term 'paradox') because increasing the carrying capacity of the ecological system beyond a certain value leads to dynamic instability and extinction of the predator species.

== See also ==
- Braess's paradox: Adding extra capacity to a network may reduce overall performance.
- Paradox of the pesticides: Applying pesticides may increase the pest population.

== Other reading ==
- Gilpin, Michael; Rosenzweig, Michael (1972). "Enriched Predator–Prey Systems: Theoretical Stability". Science. 177 (4052): 902–904. Bibcode:1972Sci...177..902G. doi:10.1126/science.177.4052.902. PMID 17780992.
- May, Robert (1972). "Limit Cycles in Predator–Prey Communities". Science. 177 (4052): 900–902. Bibcode:1972Sci...177..900M. doi:10.1126/science.177.4052.900. PMID 17780991. S2CID 33149522.
- Rosenzweig, Michael (1971). "The Paradox of Enrichment". Science. 171 (3969): 385–387. Bibcode:1971Sci...171..385R. doi:10.1126/science.171.3969.385. PMID 5538935. S2CID 43699627.
- Kot, Mark (2001). Elements of Mathematical Ecology. Cambridge University Press. ISBN 0-521-80213-X.
- Roy, Shovonlal; Chattopadhyay, J. (2007). "The stability of ecosystems: A brief overview of the paradox of enrichment" (PDF). Journal of Biosciences. 32 (2): 421–428. Bibcode:2007JBios..32..421R. doi:10.1007/s12038-007-0040-1. ISSN 0250-5991. PMID 17435332. S2CID 16526292.
