= Predation rates =

Biology term

The term predation rate refers to the frequency with which an organism captures and consumes its prey in an ecosystem. Coupled with the kill rate, the predation rate drives the population dynamics of predation. This statistic is related to Predator–prey dynamics and may be influenced by several factors.

In order for predation to occur, a predator and its prey must encounter one another. A low concentration of prey decreases the likelihood of such encounters. The prey encounter rate is determined by the abundance of organisms and a predator’s ability to locate its prey. Covering more territory increases the likelihood that a predator will meet its prey. In areas of low prey density, predators are adapted to be more motile, engage in filter feeding, or use attractants such as chemical lures.

If predation increased simply with prey concentration, the relationship would be linear until a limit is reached. This scenario is represented by Holling's type I functional response, which is rarely observed in nature. Several factors affect this relationship, including handling time (the time required for a predator to consume its prey), selective feeding behaviors, and learning. In contrast, Holling's type II and type III functional responses account for the time predators spend handling prey and the reduced efficiency in locating prey at low densities.

Predation rate is also influenced by spatial and temporal mismatch. An extreme example occurred in the Arctic in May of 2021 and 2022, when large blooms of Phytoplankton were observed alongside low concentrations of grazers. As the phytoplankton bloomed and died, the energy was not transferred into the Food web. Although primary production was high, the food web experienced an energy deficit. Spatial mismatch is particularly concerning under Climate change, as changing environmental parameters—such as rising Sea surface temperature and alterations in terrestrial habitats (e.g., loss of Tundra and melting Sea ice)—can create conditions that are no longer conducive to the populations they once supported
