= Numerical response =

The numerical response in ecology is the change in predator density as a function of change in prey density. The term numerical response was coined by M. E. Solomon in 1949. It is associated with the functional response, which is the change in predator's rate of prey consumption with change in prey density. As Holling notes, total predation can be expressed as a combination of functional and numerical response. The numerical response has two mechanisms: the demographic response and the aggregational response. The numerical response is not necessarily proportional to the change in prey density, usually resulting in a time lag between prey and predator populations. For example, there is often a scarcity of predators when the prey population is increasing.

== Demographic response ==
The demographic response consists of changes in the rates of predator reproduction or survival due to changes in prey density. The increase in prey availability translates into higher energy intake and reduced energy output. This is different from an increase in energy intake due to increased foraging efficiency, which is considered a functional response. This concept can be articulated in the Lotka-Volterra Predator-Prey Model.

$dP/dt = acVP-mP$

a = conversion efficiency: the fraction of prey energy assimilated by the predator and turned into new predators
P = predator density
V = prey density
m = predator mortality
c = capture rate

Demographic response consists of a change in dP/dt due to a change in V and/or m. For example, if V increases, then predator growth rate (dP/dt) will increase. Likewise if the energy intake increases (due to greater food availability) and a decrease in energy output (from foraging), then predator mortality (m) will decrease and predator growth rate (dP/dt) will increase. In contrast, the functional response consists of a change in conversion efficiency (a) or capture rate (c).

The relationship between available energy and reproductive efforts can be explained with the life history theory in the trade-off between fecundity and growth/survival. If an organism has more net energy, then the organism will sacrifice less energy dedicated to survival per reproductive effort and will therefore increase its reproduction rate.

In parasitism, functional response is measured by the rate of infection or laying of eggs in host, rather than the rate of prey consumption as it is measured in predation. Numerical response in parasitism is still measured by the change in number of adult parasites relative to change in host density. Parasites can demonstrate a more pronounced numerical response to changes in host density since there is often a more direct connection (less time lag) between food and reproduction in that both needs are immediately satisfied by its interaction with the host.

== Aggregational response ==
The aggregational response, as defined by Readshaw in 1973, is a change in predator population due to immigration into an area with increased prey population. In an experiment conducted by Turnbull in 1964, he observed the consistent migration of spiders from boxes without prey to boxes with prey. He proved that hunger impacts predator movement.

Riechert and Jaeger studied how predator competition interferes with the direct correlation between prey density and predator immigration. One way this can occur is through exploitation competition: the differential efficiency in use of available resources, for example, an increase in spiders' web size (functional response). The other possibility is interference competition where site owners actively prevent other foragers from coming in vicinity.

== Ecological relevance ==
The concept of numerical response becomes practically important when trying to create a strategy for pest control. The study of spiders as a biological mechanism for pest control has driven much of the research on aggregational response. Antisocial predator populations that display territoriality, such as spiders defending their web area, may not display the expected aggregational response to increased prey density.

A credible, simple alternative to the Lotka-Volterra predator-prey model and its common prey dependent generalizations is the ratio dependent or Arditi-Ginzburg model. The two are the extremes of the spectrum of predator interference models. According to the authors of the alternative view, the data show that true interactions in nature are so far from the Lotka-Volterra extreme on the interference spectrum that the model can simply be discounted as wrong. They are much closer to the ratio dependent extreme, so if a simple model is needed one can use the Arditi-Ginzburg model as the first approximation.
