= Predator satiation =

Anti-predator adaption

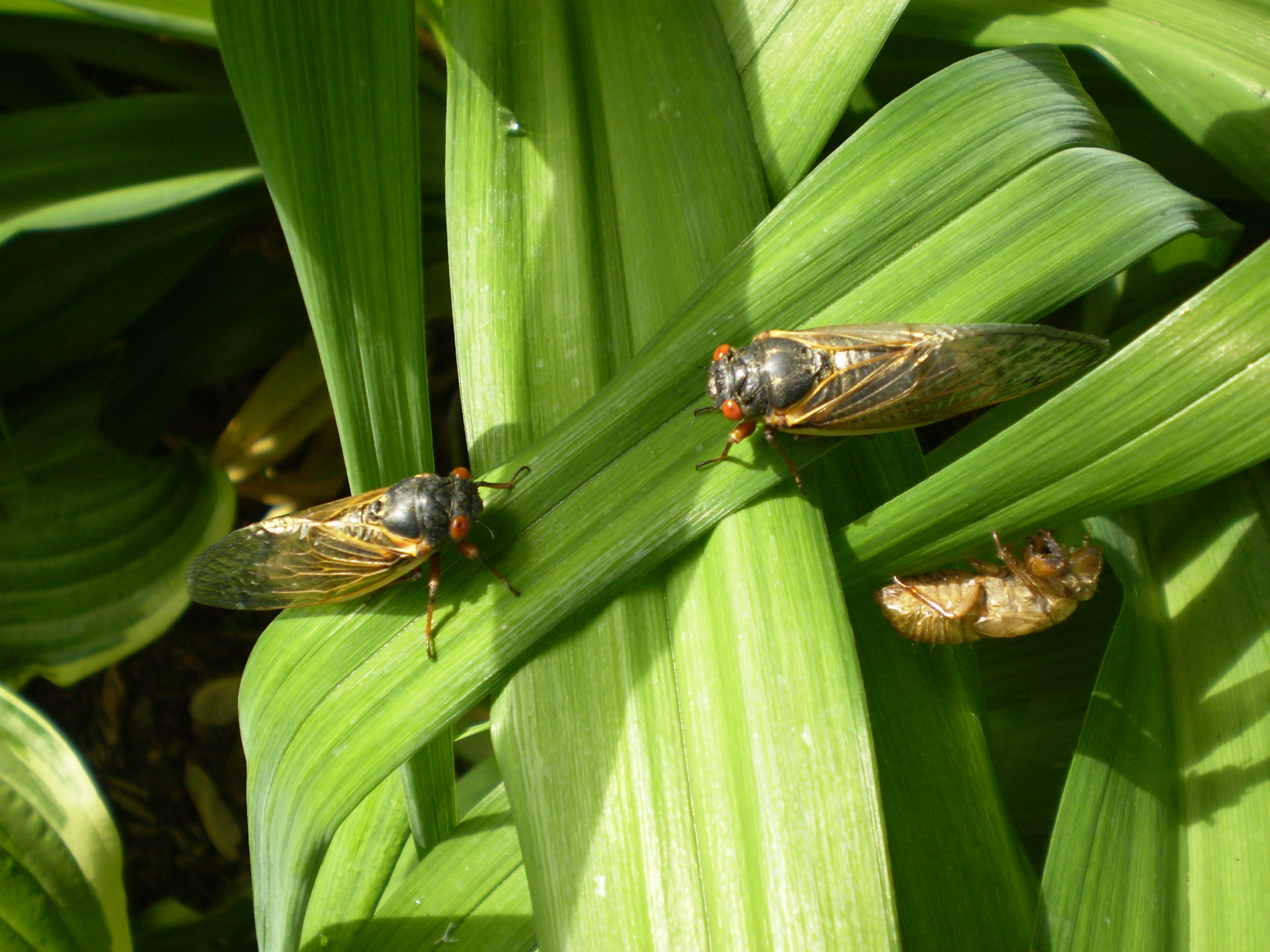
Predator satiation has evolved as a reproductive pattern in periodical cicadas of the genus Magicicada.

Predator satiation (less commonly called predator saturation) is an anti-predator adaptation in which prey briefly occur at high population densities, reducing the probability of an individual organism being eaten. When predators are flooded with potential prey, they can consume only a certain amount, so by occurring at high densities prey benefit from a safety in numbers effect. This strategy has evolved in a diverse range of prey, including notably many species of plants, insects, and fish. Predator satiation can be considered a type of refuge from predators.

As available food increases, a predator has more chances of survival, growth, and reproduction. However, as food supply begins to overwhelm the predator's ability to consume and process it, consumption levels off. This pattern is evident in the functional response of type II. There are also limits to population growth (numerical response), dependent on the generation time of the predator species.

This phenomenon is particularly conspicuous when it takes the form of mast seeding, the production of large numbers of seeds by a population of plants. An important element of the masting strategy is synchrony in production, which is most effective when it is staggered. This means that there should be years of mass production of seeds followed by years of very little seed production.

Some bamboos do a mass flowering, fruiting, and die-off at long intervals (many years).

Some periodical cicada (Magicicada) species erupt in large numbers from their larval stage at intervals in years that are prime numbers, 13 or 17. At high-density sites, research finds that the number eaten by birds does not increase with the number of cicada individuals and the risk of predation for each individual decreases.

In contrast to predator satiation, a different pattern is seen in response to mutualistic consumers, which benefit an organism by feeding from it (such as frugivores, which disperse seeds). For example, a vine's berries may ripen at different times, ensuring frugivores are not swamped with food and so resulting in a larger proportion of its seeds being dispersed.

== See also ==
- Reproductive synchrony
- Selfish herd theory
- Semelparity
- Surplus killing
- Swarm behaviour § Plants
- Human wave attack
