= Kolmogorov population model =

Mathematical framework

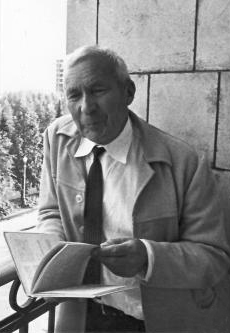
Andrey Kolmogorov

In biomathematics, the Kolmogorov population model, also known as the Kolmogorov equations in population dynamics, is a mathematical framework developed by Soviet mathematician Andrei Kolmogorov in 1936 that generalizes predator-prey interactions and population dynamics. The model was an improvement over earlier predator-prey models, notably the Lotka–Volterra equations, by incorporating more realistic biological assumptions and providing a qualitative analysis of population dynamics.

== History ==
The development of the Kolmogorov population model was influenced by Kolmogorov's early interest in biology during his schoolboy years. Despite being primarily known for his contributions to probability theory and information theory, Kolmogorov made several large contributions to biomathematics. The model was inspired by the work of Italian physicist Vito Volterra, who had developed his predator-prey equations based on observations of fish populations in the Adriatic Sea during World War I. Volterra's work showed that during the war, when fishing was reduced due to military activities, the proportion of predator fish increased while prey fish decreased.

== Definition ==
The Kolmogorov population model is expressed as a system of differential equations

$$\dot{x} = xS(x,y)$$
$$\dot{y} = yW(x,y)$$

where $x$ represents the prey population, $y$ represents the predator population, and $S$ and $W$ are continuously differentiable functions describing the growth rates of the respective populations. The rates of population change decrease as predator numbers increase:

$$\frac{\partial S}{\partial y} < 0 \quad \text{and} \quad \frac{\partial W}{\partial y} < 0$$.

The system must admit invasion by predators when prey is present in isolation; that is, $W(K,0) > 0$, where $K$ represents the carrying capacity of the prey population.

== Applications ==
The Volterra equations have no limit preventing unrealistic exponential growth scenarios. The Kolmogorov model addresses this by imposing self-limiting growth in prey populations. It also provides a predictive model for the qualitative behavior of predator-prey systems without requiring explicit functional forms for the interaction terms. In the 1960s, American ecologists Michael Rosenzweig and Robert H. MacArthur showed that the Kolmogorov model can be used to understand non-transitory oscillations in ecological systems and the conditions for local stability of predator-prey interactions.

Recent research has shown that Kolmogorov systems can exhibit complex behaviors, including the existence of strange attractors and robust permanent subsystems.

== See also ==
- Mathematical biology
- Predator-prey interactions
