= Lev R. Ginzburg =

Mathematical ecologist (born 1945)

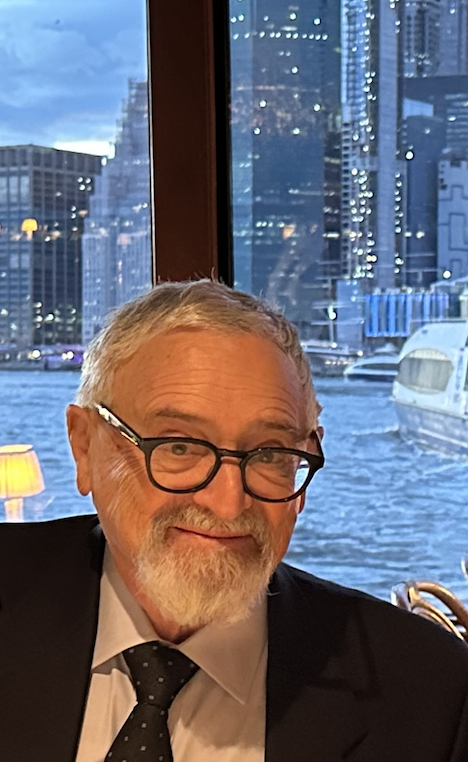
- Born: Lev Ruvimovich Ginzburg; January 11, 1945 (age 81); Moscow, Russian SSR, Soviet Union
- Education: Leningrad State University
- Known for: Arditi-Ginzburg equations; Rules of thumb for judging ecological theories
- Scientific career
- Fields: Mathematical ecology; Population and community ecology; Risk analysis; Applied biomathematics
- Workplaces: Stony Brook University; Northeastern University; Accademia dei Lincei; Agrophysical Research Institute

Lev Ruvimovich Ginzburg (Russian: Лев Рувимович Гинзбург; born 1945) is a mathematical ecologist and Professor Emeritus at Stony Brook University.

== Biography ==
Lev Ginzburg was born in 1945 in Moscow, but grew up in St. Petersburg, at the time Leningrad. He studied mathematics and theoretical mechanics at Leningrad State University (M.S. in 1967) and received his Ph.D. in applied mathematics from the Agrophysical Research Institute in 1970. He worked at this Institute until the Spring of 1975 and emigrated to the United States in December 1975. After several months at the Accademia Nazionale Dei Lincei (Rome, Italy), and one year at the Mathematics Department at Northeastern University (Boston, MA), he was a professor at the Department of Ecology and Evolution at Stony Brook University from 1977 until his retirement in 2015.

In 1982, Ginzburg founded and has since run Applied Biomathematics, a research and software firm focused on conservation biology and ecology. The company developed new methods for the assessment of risk and uncertainty in these areas.

== Work ==
Ginzburg's most known academic work is a theory of predation (the ratio-dependent or Arditi-Ginzburg equations) that is an alternative to the classic prey-dependent Lotka-Volterra model. His book, with Roger Arditi, How Species Interact, summarizes their proposed alteration of the standard view. The recent editions of the standard college Ecology textbook devote equal space to the Lotka-Volterra and Arditi-Ginzburg equations. His concept of inertial growth or an explanation of population cycles, based upon maternal effect model, is the main point of his book written with Mark Colyvan, Ecological Orbits, and a more recent paper co-authored with Charley Krebs. His current interest is an evolutionary theory of non-adaptive selection (selective disappearance of unstable configurations). His most recent book, written with John Damuth, Nonadaptive Selection: An Evolutionary Source of Ecological Laws, relates to this area of research.

The 2018 study has listed the 2004 Ginzburg and Jensen paper, "Rules of thumb for judging ecological theories" as one of the 100 must-reads in the history of Ecology, a selection out of half a million papers since Darwin.

Applied Biomathematics was funded primarily by research grants and contracts from the U.S. government and private industry associations. Grants included awards from the National Institutes of Health, the United States Department of Agriculture, NASA, the National Science Foundation, and the Nuclear Regulatory Commission. Other project funding had come from the Electric Power Research Institute and individual utility companies, healthcare, pharmaceutical and seed companies such as Pfizer, DuPont and Dow, and the U.S. Army Corps of Engineers. Applied Biomathematics translated theoretical concepts from biology and the physical sciences into new mathematical and statistical methods to quantitatively solve practical problems in these areas using risk analysis and reliability assessments. In 2001, Ginzburg testified in the U.S. Senate on the quantitative aspects of endangered species legislation. Ginzburg's work in risk analysis and applied ecology had been conducted at Applied Biomathematics in collaboration with Scott Ferson and Resit Akcakaya, who are now professors at the University of Liverpool, UK, and Stony Brook University, New York, USA respectively. The methods and RAMAS software products developed by Applied Biomathematics are used by hundreds of academic institutions around the world, government agencies, and industrial and private labs in over 60 countries.

== Influential papers ==
Ginzburg published over 200 scientific articles and ten books.

=== Mathematical ecology ===
- Ginzburg, L. R. and Jensen, C. X. J. 2004. Rules of thumb for judging ecological theories. Trends in Ecology and Evolution 19: 121-126.
- Abrams, P. A. and Ginzburg, L. R. 2000. The nature of predation: prey-dependent, ratio-dependent, or neither? Trends in Ecology and Evolution 15: 337-341.
- Ginzburg, L. R. and Taneyhill, D. E. 1994. Population cycles of forest Lepidoptera: a maternal effect hypothesis. Journal of Animal Ecology 63: 79-92.
- Ginzburg, L. R. and Akçakaya, H. R. 1992. Consequences of ratio-dependent predation for steady state properties of ecosystems. Ecology 73(5):1536-1543.
- Arditi, R. and Ginzburg, L. R. 1989. Coupling in predatory-prey dynamics: ratio-dependence. Journal of Theoretical Biology 139:311-326.

=== Risk analysis ===
- Ferson, S. and Ginzburg, L. R. 1996. Different methods are needed to propagate ignorance and variability. Reliability Engineering and Systems Safety 54:133-144.
- Ginzburg, L. R., Ferson, S. and Akçakaya, H. R. 1990. Reconstructability of density dependence and the conservative assessment of extinction risk. Conservation Biology 4:63-70.
- Ginzburg, L. R., Slobodkin, L. B., Johnson, K. and Bindman, A. G. 1982. Quasiextinction probabilities as a measure of impact on population growth. Risk Analysis 2: 171-181.
