= Reconciliation ecology =

Study of maintaining biodiversity in human-dominated ecosystems

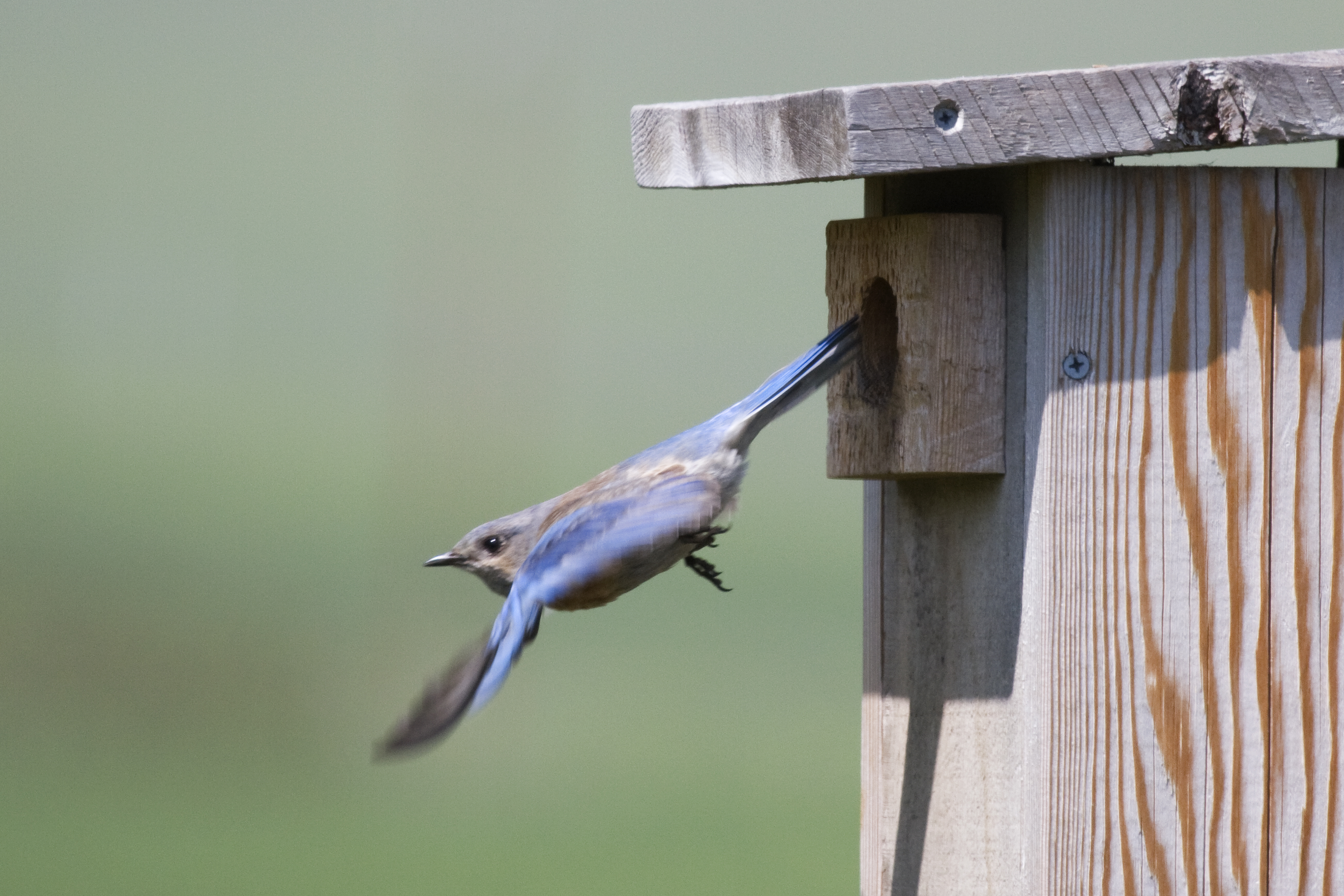
A simple form of reconciliation ecology: the construction of nest boxes increases densities of bluebirds in areas where natural tree cavities are scarce due to short-rotation forestry.

Reconciliation ecology is the branch of ecology which studies ways to encourage biodiversity in the human-dominated ecosystems of the anthropocene era. Michael Rosenzweig first articulated the concept in his book Win-Win Ecology, based on the theory that there is not enough area for all of earth's biodiversity to be saved within designated nature preserves. Therefore, humans should increase biodiversity in human-dominated landscapes. By managing for biodiversity in ways that do not decrease human utility of the system, it is a "win-win" situation for both human use and native biodiversity. The science is based in the ecological foundation of human land-use trends and species-area relationships. It has many benefits beyond protection of biodiversity, and there are numerous examples of it around the globe. Aspects of reconciliation ecology can already be found in management legislation, but there are challenges in both public acceptance and ecological success of reconciliation attempts.

== Theoretical basis ==
=== Human land use trends ===
Traditional conservation is based on "reservation and restoration"; reservation meaning setting pristine lands aside for the sole purpose of maintaining biodiversity, and restoration meaning returning human impacted ecosystems to their natural state. However, reconciliation ecologists argue that there is too great a proportion of land already impacted by humans for these techniques to succeed.

While it is difficult to measure exactly how much land has been transformed by human use, estimates range from 39 to 50%. This includes agricultural land, pastureland, urban areas, and heavily harvested forest systems. An estimated 50% of arable land is already under cultivation. Land transformation has increased rapidly over the last fifty years, and is likely to continue to increase. Beyond direct transformation of land area, humans have impacted the global biogeochemical cycles, leading to human caused change in even the most remote areas. These include addition of nutrients such nitrogen and phosphorus, acid rain, ocean acidification, redistribution of water resources, and increased carbon dioxide in the atmosphere. Humans have also changed species compositions of many landscapes that they do not dominate directly by introducing new species or harvesting native species. This new assemblage of species has been compared to previous mass extinctions and speciation events caused by formation of land bridges and colliding of continents.

=== Species-area relationships ===
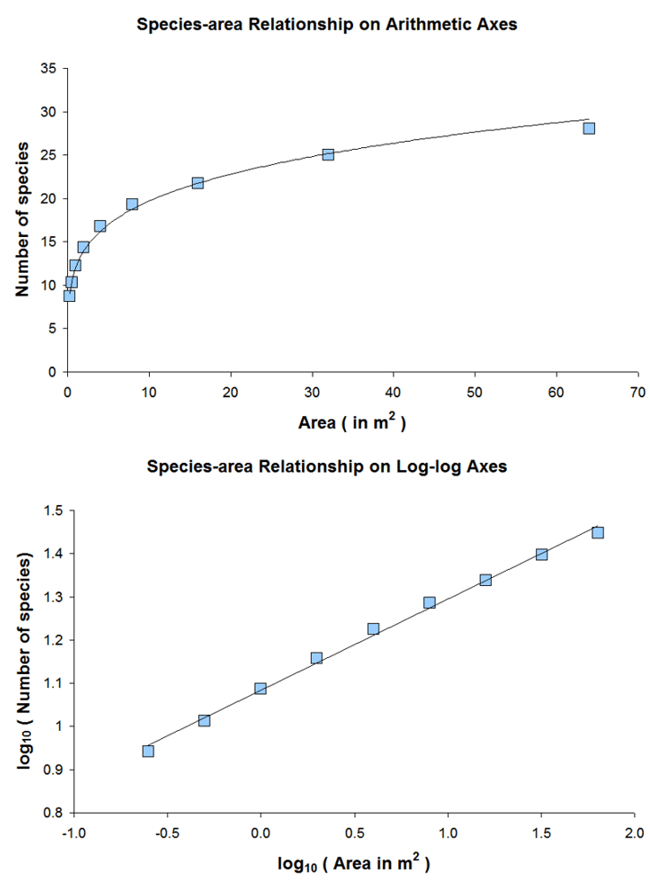
The species-area relationship for a contiguous habitat

The need for reconciliation ecology was derived from patterns of species distribution and diversity. The most relevant of these patterns is the species-area curve which states that a larger geographic area will contain higher species diversity. This relationship has been supported by so large a body of research that some scholars consider it to be an ecological law.

There are two main reasons for the relationship between number of species and area, both of which can be used as an argument for conservation of larger areas. The habitat heterogeneity hypothesis claims that a larger geographic area will have a greater variety of habitat types, and therefore more species adapted to each unique habitat type. Setting aside a small area will not encompass enough habitat variety to contain a large variety of species. The equilibrium hypothesis draws from the theory of island biogeography as described by MacArthur and Wilson. Large areas have large populations, which are less likely to go extinct through stochastic processes. The theory assumes that speciation rates are constant with area, and a lower extinction rate coupled with higher speciation leads to more species.

The species-area relationship has often been applied to conservation, often quantitatively. The simplest and most commonly used formula was first published by Frank W. Preston. The number of species present in a given area increases in relationship to that area with the relationship S = cA^{z} where S is the number of species, A is the area, and c and z are constants which vary with the system under study. This equation has frequently been used for designing reserve size and placement (see SLOSS debate). The most common version of the equation used in reserve design is the formula for inter-island diversity, which has a z-value between 0.25 and 0.55, meaning protecting 5% of the available habitat will preserve 40% of the species present. However, inter-provincial species area relationships have z-values closer to 1, meaning protecting 5% of habitat will only protect 5% of species diversity.

Taken together, proponents of reconciliation ecology see the species-area relationship and human domination of a large percentage of the earth's area as a sign that we will not be able to set aside enough land to protect all of life's biodiversity. There can be negative effects of setting land aside because it means the remaining land is used more intensely. For example, less land is required for crop production when high levels of inorganic fertilizer is applied, but these chemicals will affect nearby land set aside for natural ecosystems. The direct benefits of land transformation for the growing world population often make it ethically difficult to justify the tradeoff between biodiversity and human use. Reconciled ecosystems are ones in which humans dominate, but natural biodiversity is encouraged to persist within the human landscape. Ideally, this creates a more sustainable socio-ecological system and does not necessitate a trade off between biodiversity and human use.

=== Beyond natural history ===
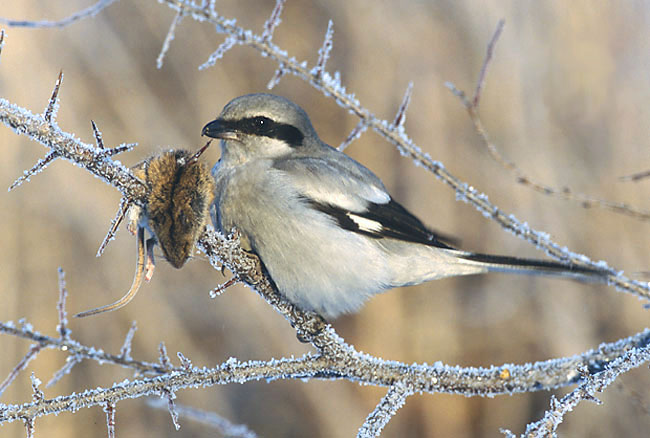
The life history of the great grey shrike is better understood as a result of focused natural history and reconciliation ecology.

How can understanding of species' natural history aid their effective conservation in human-dominated ecosystems? Humans often conduct activities that allow for the incorporation of other species, whether as a by-product or as a result of a focus on nature. Traditional natural history can only inform how best to do this to a certain degree, because landscapes have been changed so dramatically. However, there is much more to learn through direct study of species' ecology in human-dominated ecosystems, through what is known as focused natural history. Rosenzweig cites four examples: shrikes (Laniidae) thrived in altered landscapes when wooden fence post perches allowed them easy access to pouncing on prey, but inhospitable steel fence posts contributed to their decline. Replacing steel fence posts with wood fence posts reverses the shrikes' decline and allows humans to determine the reasons for the distribution and abundance of shrikes. Additionally, the cirl bunting (Emberiza cirlus) thrived on farms when fields alternated between harvests and hay, but declined where farmers began to plant winter grain crops, natterjack toads (Bufo calamatus) declined when reductions in sheep grazing ceased to alter ponds to their preferred shape and depth, and longleaf pine (Pinus palustris) declined in the Southeastern United States when lack of wildfires prevented its return after timbering. Thus, applying focused natural history in human-dominated landscapes can contribute to conservation efforts.

The emerging concept of ecosystem services (coined by the Millennium Ecosystem Assessment in 2005) changed the way ecologists perceived so-called "ordinary species" : as abundant species represent the bulk of biomass and biological processes, even if they don't appear directly threatened their conservation constitutes as a major concern for maintaining these services on which rely both human societies and rarer species. Reconciliation ecology then proposes to take care of such species and to maintain (or restore) ecological processes in human-dominated ecosystems, hence creating ecological corridors and preserving a good functioning of biological cycles.

== Benefits ==
Reconciliation ecologists believe increasing biodiversity within human dominated landscapes will help to save global biodiversity. This is sometimes preferable to traditional conservation because it does not impair human use of the landscape and therefore may be more acceptable to stakeholders. However, not only will it encourage biodiversity in the areas where it takes place, but many scholars cite other benefits of including biodiversity in human landscapes on both global conservation activities and human well-being.

=== Habitat connectivity benefits ===
Increasing wildlife habitat in human-dominated systems not only increases in situ biodiversity, it also aids in conservation of surrounding protected areas by increasing connectivity between habitat patches. This may be especially important in agricultural systems where buffers, live fences, and other small habitat areas can serve as stops between major preserves. This concept forms the basis of the subdiscipline countryside biogeography which studies the potential of the matrix between preserves to provide habitat for species moving from preserve to preserve.

=== Educational benefits ===
Placing importance on native ecosystems and biodiversity within human landscapes increases human exposure to natural areas, which has been shown to increase appreciation of nature. Studies have shown that students who participate in outdoor education programs show a greater understanding of their environment, greater willingness to act in order to save the environment, and even a greater enthusiasm for school and learning. Green spaces have also been shown connect urban dwellers of all ages with nature, even when dominated by invasive species. Reconnecting people with nature is especially important for conservation because there is a tendency for people to use the biodiversity present in the landscape they grew up in as a point of comparison for future trends (see Shifting baseline).

=== Psychological benefits ===
The results of reconciliation ecology can also improve human well-being. E. O. Wilson has hypothesized that humans have an innate desire to be close to nature (see Biophilia), and numerous studies have linked natural settings to decreased stress and faster recovery during hospital stays.

== Examples ==
Many examples of native plants and animals taking advantage of human dominated landscapes have been unintentional, but may be enhanced as part of reconciliation ecology. Others are intentional redesigns of human landscapes to better accommodate native biodiversity. These have been going on for many hundreds of years including examples within agricultural systems, urban and suburban systems, marine systems, and even industrial areas.

=== Historical examples ===
While Rosenzweig formalized the concept, humans have been encouraging biodiversity within human landscapes for millennia. In the Trebon Biosphere Reserve of the Czech Republic, a system of human-engineered aquaculture ponds built in the 1500s not only provides a profitable harvest of fish, but also provides habitat for a hugely diverse wetland ecosystem. Many cities in Europe take pride in their local population of storks, which nest on roofs or in church towers that replace the trees they would naturally nest in. There are records of humans maintaining plants in pleasure gardens as early as ancient Mesopotamia, with an especially strong tradition of incorporating gardens into the architecture of human landscapes in China.

=== Agricultural systems ===
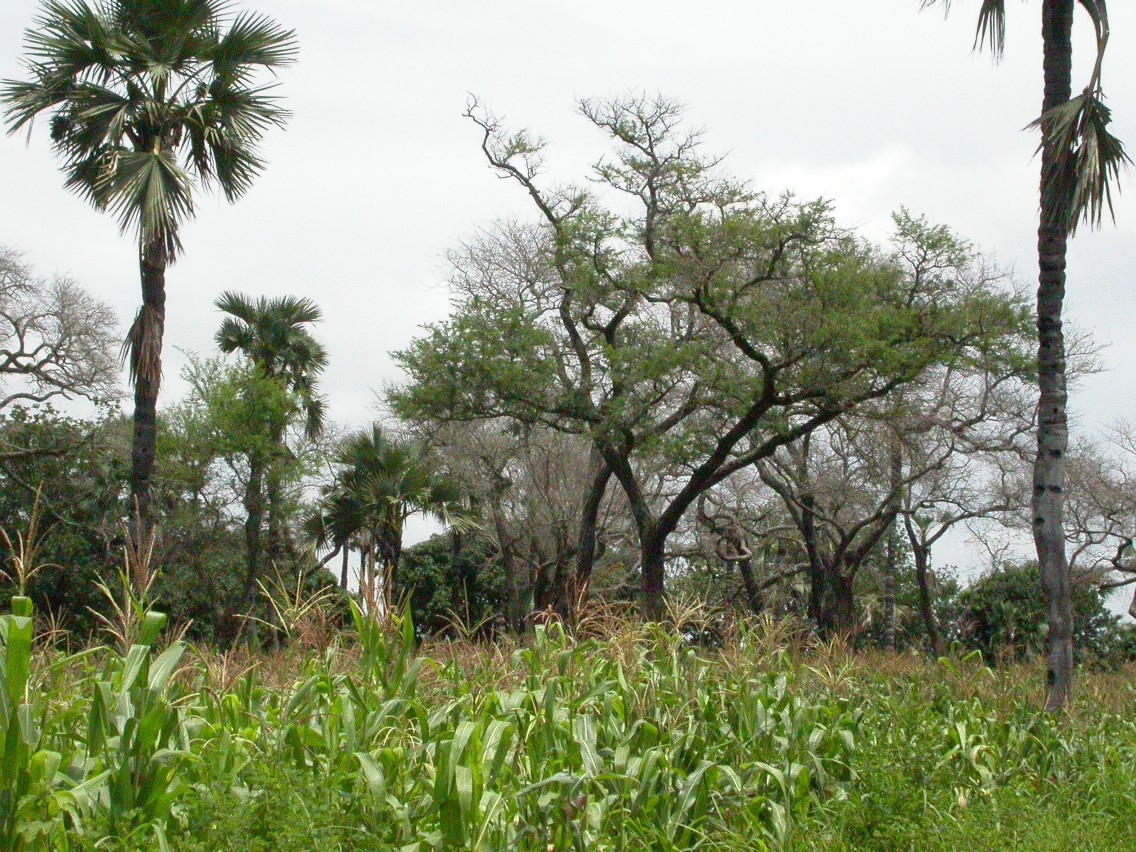
Agroforestry in Burkina Faso allows sorghum crop to be grown under native tree species, preserving biodiversity.

Agroforestry provides many examples of reconciliation ecology at work. In tropical agroforestry systems, crops such as coffee or fruit trees are cultivated under a canopy of shade trees, providing habitat for tropical forest species outside of protected areas. For example, shade-grown coffee plantations typically have lower tree diversity than unmanaged forests, however they have much higher tree species diversity and richness than other agricultural methods. Agriculture that mimics nature, encourages natural forest species along with the crops, and also takes pressure off nearby uncultivated forest areas where people are allowed to collect forest products. The understory can also be managed with reconciliation ecology: allowing weeds to grow among crops (minimizing labor and preventing the invasion of noxious weed species) and leaving fallowlands alongside farmed areas can enhance understory plant richness with associated benefits for native insects and birds compared to other agricultural practices.

The oil palm (Elaeis guineensis) provides another example of the potential of reconciliation ecology. It is one of the most important and rapidly expanding tropical crops, so lucrative because it is used in many products throughout the world. Unfortunately, oil-palm agriculture is one of the main drivers of forest conversion in Southeast Asia and is devastating for native biodiversity, perhaps even more so than logging. However, attempts are being made to foster the sustainability of this industry. As a monoculture, oil palm is subject to potentially devastating attacks from insect pests. Many companies are attempting an integrated pest management approach which encourages the planting of species that support predators and parasitoids of these insect pests, as well as an active native bird community. Experiments have shown that a functioning bird community, especially at higher densities, can serve to reduce insect herbivory on oil palms, promoting increased crop yields and profits. Thus, oil palm plantation managers can participate in reconciliation ecology by promoting local vegetation that is beneficial to insectivorous birds, including maintaining ground plants that serve as nesting sites, thereby protecting natural communities. Additionally, steps such as maintaining riparian buffer zones or natural forest patches can help to slow the loss of biodiversity within oil palm plantation landscapes. By engaging in these environmentally friendly practices, fewer chemicals and less effort are required to maintain both plantation productivity and ecosystem services.

There are many grazing practices that also encourage native biodiversity. In Rosenzweig's book he uses the example of a rancher in Arizona who intentionally deepened his cattle ponds in order to save a population of threatened leopard frogs (Rana chiricahuensis), with no detriment to the use of those tanks for cattle, and a similar situation has occurred with the vulnerable California tiger salamander (Ambystoma californiense) in the Central Valley of California. Research has shown that without cattle grazing, many of the remaining vernal pools would dry too early for the salamanders to complete their life cycle under global climate change predictions. In Central America, a large percentage of pastureland is fenced using live trees which are not only low maintenance for the farmer, but also provide habitat for birds, bats, and invertebrates which cannot persist in open pastureland. Another example from Rosenzweig involves encouraging loggerhead shrikes (Lanius ludovicianus) to populate pastureland by placing perches around the pasture. These are all simple, low-cost ways to encourage biodiversity without negatively impacting the human uses of the landscape.

=== Urban systems ===
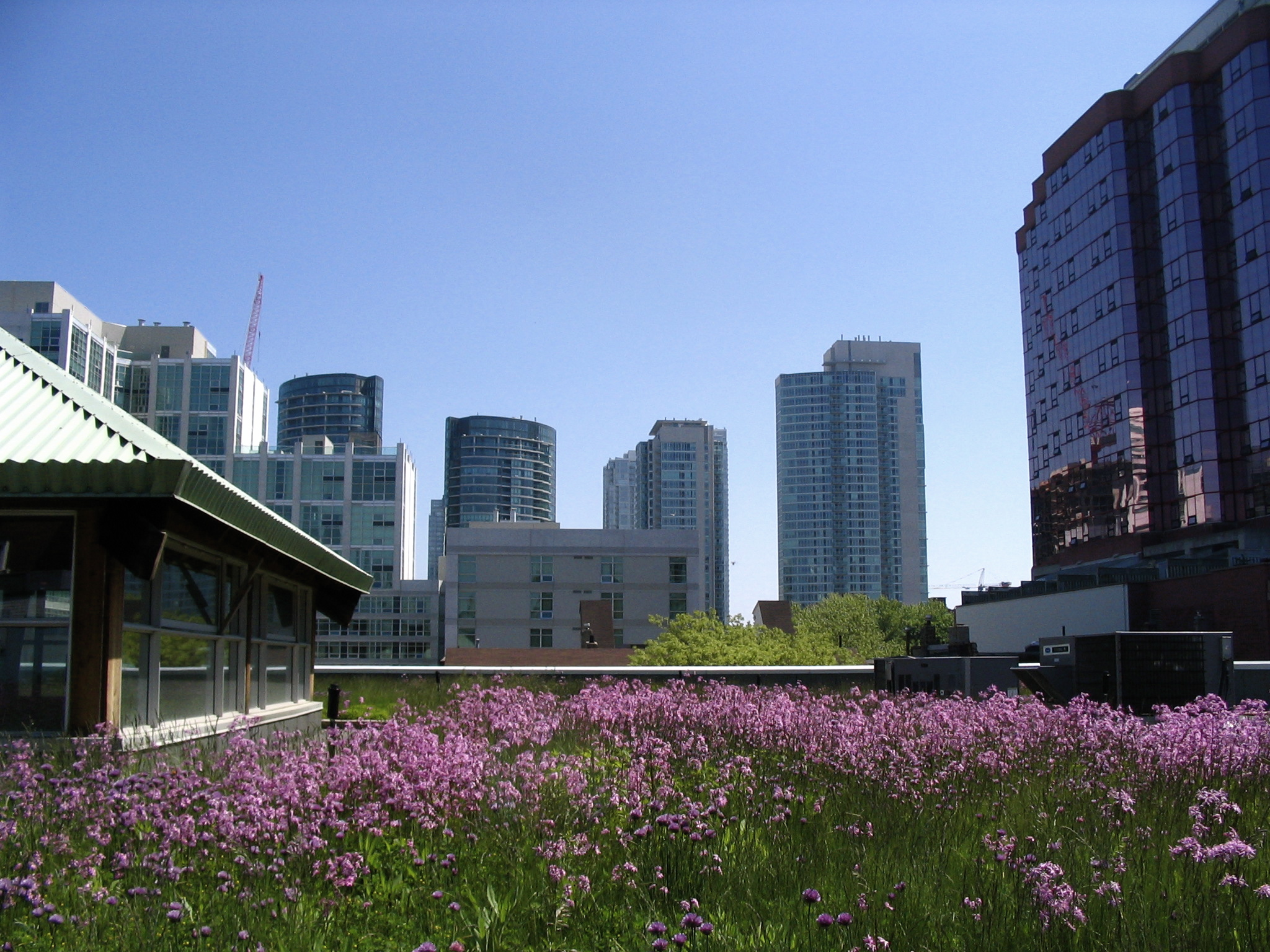
Green roofs can help maintain species diversity in urban landscapes.

Urban ecology can be included under the umbrella of reconciliation ecology and it tackles biodiversity in cities, the most extreme of human-dominated landscapes. Cities occupy less than 3% of global surface area, but are responsible for a majority of carbon emissions, residential water use, and wood use. Cities also have unique climatic conditions such as the urban heat island effect, which can greatly affect biodiversity. There is a growing trend among city managers to take biodiversity into account when planning city development, especially in rapidly growing cities. Cities often have surprisingly high plant biodiversity due to their normally high degree of habitat heterogeneity and high numbers of gardens and green spaces cultivated to include a large variety of species. However, these species are often not native, and a large part of the total urban biodiversity is usually made up of exotic species.

Because cities are so highly impacted by human activities, restoration to the pristine state is not possible, however there are modifications that can be made to increase habitat without negatively impacting human needs. In urban rivers, addition of large woods and floating islands to provide habitat, modifications to walls and other structures to mimic natural banks, and buffer areas to reduce pollutants can all increase biodiversity without reducing the flood control and water supply services. Urban green spaces can be re-designed to encourage natural ecosystems rather than manicured lawns, as is seen in the National Wildlife Federation’s Backyard Wildlife Habitat program. Peregrine falcons (Falco peregrinus), which were once endangered by pesticide use, are frequently seen nesting in tall urban buildings throughout North America, feeding chiefly on the introduced rock dove. The steep walls of buildings mimic the cliffs peregrines naturally nest in and the rock doves replace the native prey species that were driven out of urban areas.

=== Industrial systems ===
In Florida, the Florida manatee (Trichechus manatus latirostris) uses warm water discharged from power plants as a refuge when the temperature of the Gulf of Mexico drops. These warm areas replace the warm springs that manatees once naturally used in the winter. These springs have been drained or cut off from open water by human uses. American crocodiles (Crocodylus acutus) have a similar habitat in the cooling canals of the Turkey Point power plant, where an estimated 10% of the total North American population of the species lives.

Wastewater treatment systems have shown potential for reconciliation ecology on numerous occasions. Man-made wetlands designed to remove nitrogen before runoff from agriculture enters the Everglades in Florida are used as breeding sites for a number of birds, including the endangered wood stork (Mycteria americana). Stormwater treatment ponds can provide important breeding habitat for amphibians, especially where natural wetlands have been drained by human development.

=== Ocean systems ===
Coral reefs have been intensively impacted by human use, including overfishing and mining of the reef itself. One reconciliation approach to this problem is building artificial reefs that not only provide valuable habitat for aquatic species, but also protect nearby islands from storms when the natural structure has been mined away. Even structures as simple as scrap metal and automobiles can be used as habitat, providing added benefits of freeing space in landfills.

== Legislation ==
Governmental intervention can aid in encouraging private landowners to create habitat or otherwise increase biodiversity on their land. The United States' Endangered Species Act requires landowners to halt any activities negatively affecting endangered species on their land, which is a disincentive for them to encourage endangered species to settle on their land in the first place. To help mediate this problem, the US Fish and Wildlife Service has instituted safe harbor agreements whereby the landowner engages in restoration on their land to encourage endangered species, and the government agrees not to place further regulation on their activities should they want to reverse the restoration at a later date. This practice has already led to an increase in aplomado falcons (Falco femoralis) in Texas and red-cockaded woodpeckers (Picoides borealis) in the Southeastern US.

Another example is the US Department of Agriculture’s Conservation Reserve Program (CRP). The CRP was originally put in place to protect soil from erosion, but also has major implications for conservation of biodiversity. In the program, landowners take their land out of agricultural production and plant trees, shrubs, and other permanent, erosion controlling vegetation. Unintended, but ecologically significant consequences of this were the reduction of runoff, improved water quality, creation of wildlife habitat, and possible carbon sequestration.

== Challenges ==
While reconciliation ecology attempts to modify the human world to encourage biodiversity without negatively impacting human use, there are many challenges in obtaining broad acceptance of the idea. For example, the addition of forest corridors to urban river systems, which improves water quality and enhances critical habitat structure for aquatic invertebrates and fish may be seen as 'wasting' valuable real estate. Similarly, many suburban areas do not allow native vegetation that provides useful wildlife habitat because it is perceived as "untidy", reflects an apathetic attitude, and may reduce property values. In addition, many humans have negative feelings toward certain species, especially predators such as coyotes and wolves, which are often based more on perceived risk than actual risk of loss or injury resulting from the animal. Even with cooperation of the human element of the equation, reconciliation ecology can not help every species. Some animals, such as several species of waterfowl, show strong avoidance behaviors toward humans and any form of human disturbance. No matter how nice an urban park is built, the proximity of humans will scare away some birds. Other species must maintain large territories, and barriers that abound in human habitats, such as roads, will stop them from coexisting with humans. These animals will require undisturbed land set aside for them.

There is hence a double social challenge for reconciliation ecology : making people's perception of biodiversity evolve, and then changing relating norms and policies so as to better consider biodiversity as a positive component in our habitat.

== See also ==
- Sustainable agriculture
- Sustainability
- Sustainable development
- Community (ecology)
- Restoration ecology
- Rewilding
- Human impacts on the nitrogen cycle
- Human impact of climate change
- Ecological footprint
- Species-area curve
- Conservation biology
