= Hunting success =

Likelihood of a hunt ending in success

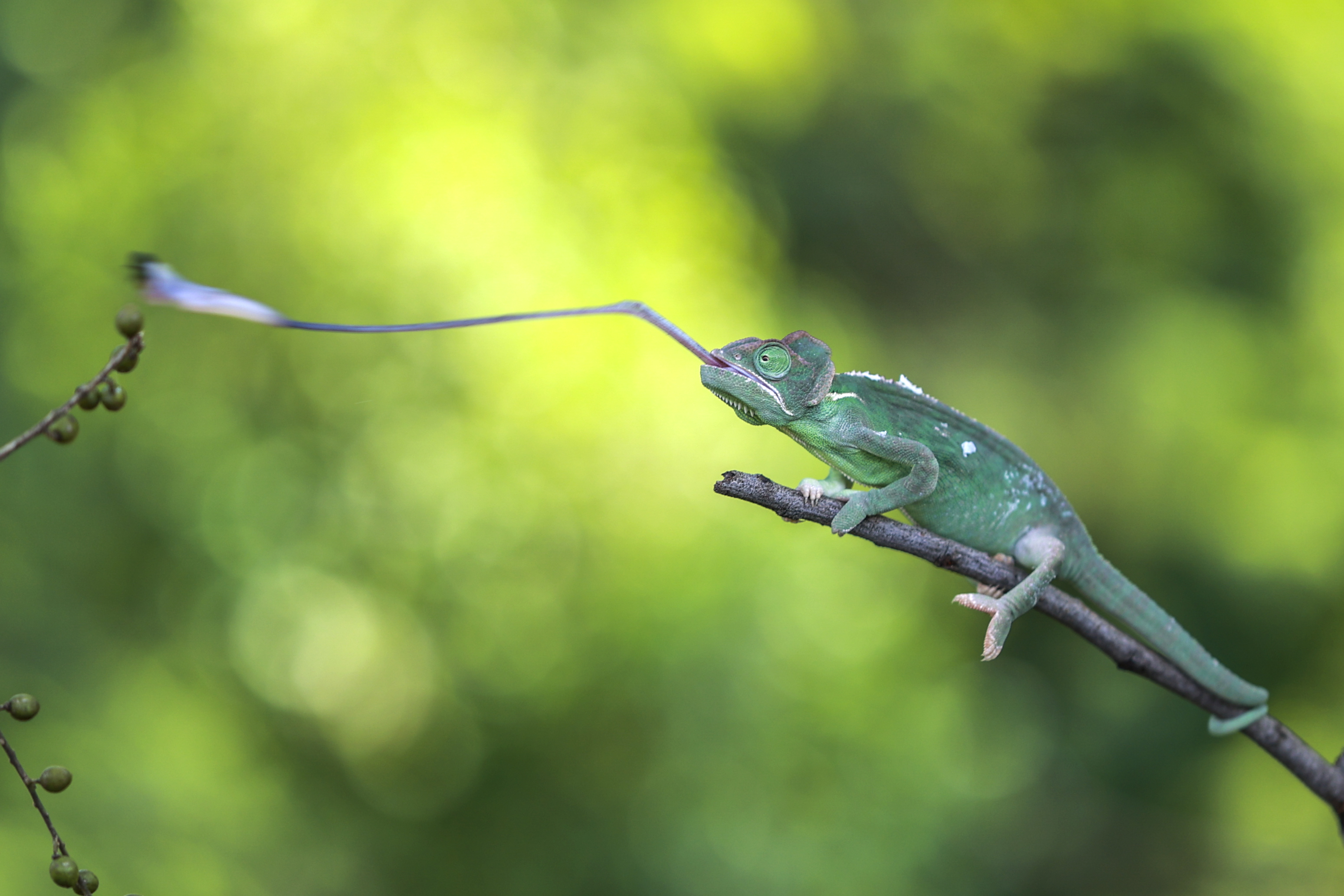
A chameleon successfully catching prey with its tongue

In ecology, hunting success is the proportion of hunts initiated by a predatory organism that end in success. Hunting success is determined by a number of factors such as the features of the predator, timing, different age classes, conditions for hunting, experience, and physical capabilities. Predators selectively target certain categories of prey, in particular prey of a certain size. Prey animals that are in poor health are targeted and this contributes to the predator's hunting success. Different predation strategies can also contribute to hunting success, for example, hunting in groups gives predators an advantage over a solitary predator, and pack hunters like lions can kill animals that are too powerful for a solitary predator to overcome.

Similar to hunting success, kill rates are the number of animals an individual predator kills per time unit. Hunting success rate focuses on the percentage of successful hunts. Hunting success is also measured in humans, but due to their unnaturally high hunting success, human hunters can have a big effect on prey population and behaviour, especially in areas lacking natural predators, recreational hunting can have inferences for wildlife populations.

== Definition ==
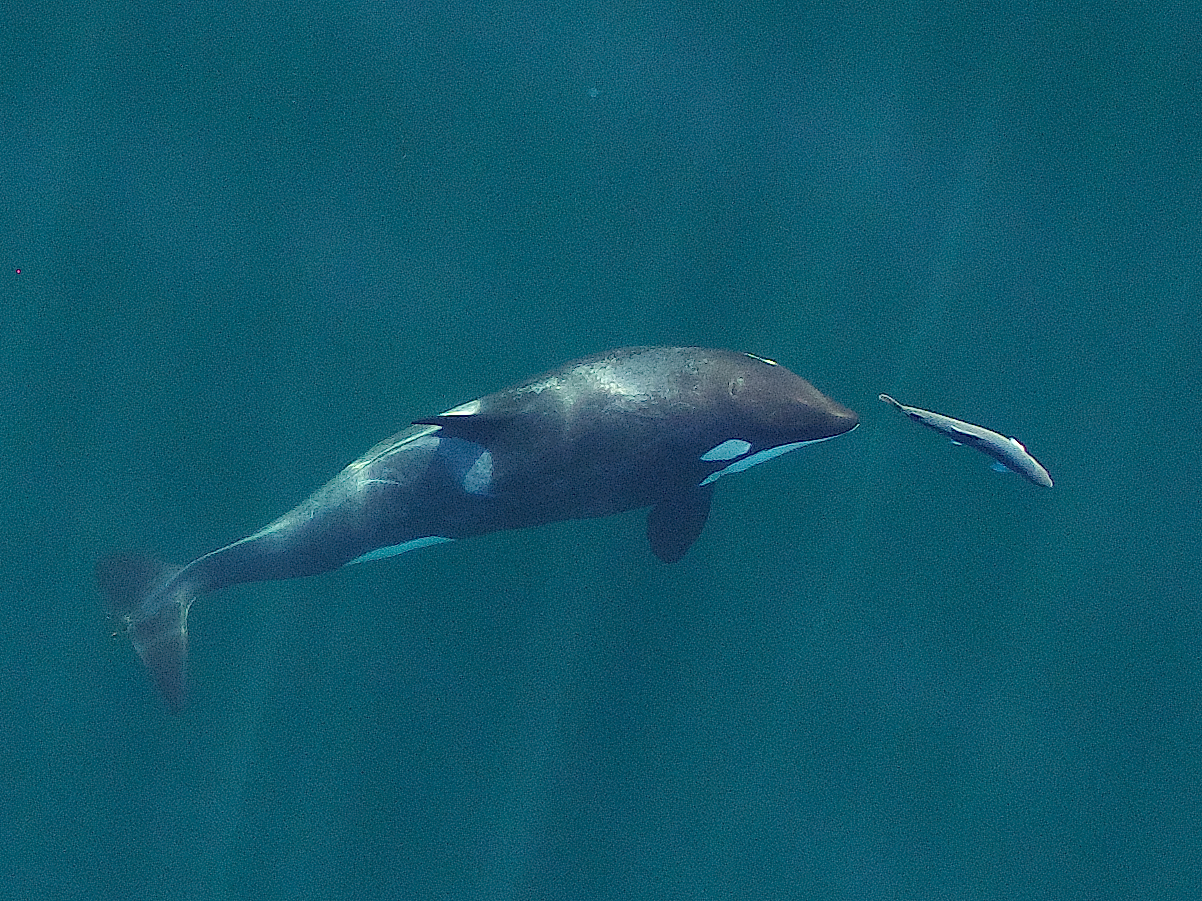
The orca is an intelligent and social species of dolphin. It uses pack hunting and pursuit predation.

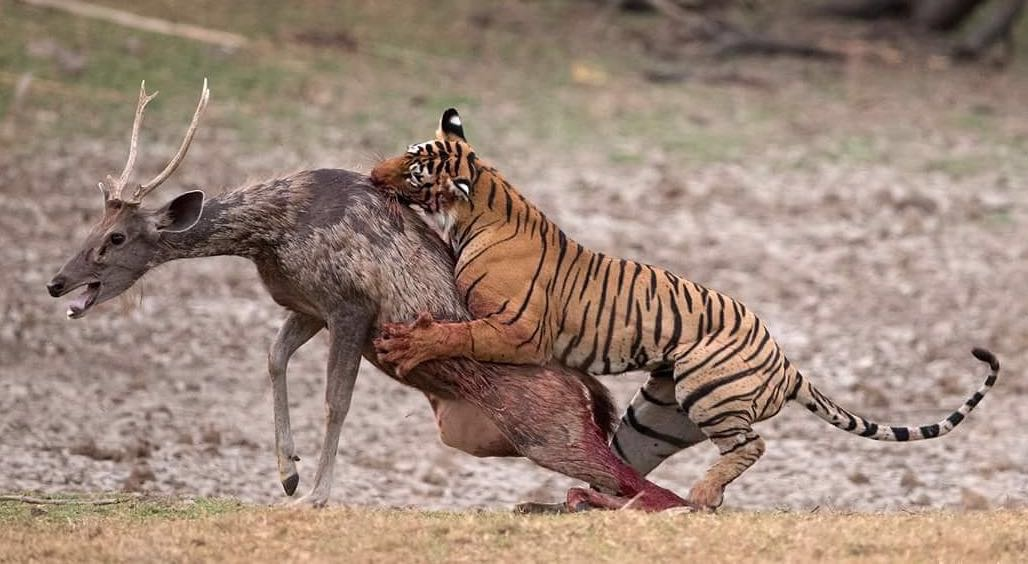
The tiger is a solitary hunter that specializes in ambush and prefers preying on ungulates

Predators may actively seek out prey, if the predator spots its preferred target it would decide whether to attack or continue searching, and success ultimately depends on a number of factors. Predators may deploy a variety of hunting methods such as ambush, ballistic interception, pack hunting or pursuit predation. Hunting success is used to measure a predator's success rate against a species of prey or against all prey species in its diet, for example in the Mweya area of Queen Elizabeth National Park, lions had a hunting success of 54% against African buffaloes and 35.7% against common warthogs, though their overall hunting success was only 27.9%.

Hunting success across the animal kingdom vary from 5–97% and hunting success can greatly differ between different populations of the same species. Hunting success can be measured for predators in different trophic levels. Hunting success rate is the percentage of captures in a number of initiated hunts, for example, 1 in 2 to 20 tiger hunts are guessed to end in success, which means tigers are guessed to have a hunting success rate of between 5–50%. Percentage is the preferred method used to write hunting success rather than raw numbers. Usually a single study is used to represent the hunting success of an entire species or in some cases estimations are used.

Hunting success can also be used to define the number of kills a human hunter makes over a specific number of hunts. However, hunting success is not used to define the number of animals a poacher, or a canned trophy hunter kills.

== Hunting success in animals ==
Detailed field studies show that prey are usually successful at escaping predators, with hunting success rates as low as 1–5% in many systems. The result of a predatory attack largely depends on the interaction between the predator's physical performance and any evasive maneuvers by the prey animal.

=== List of animals by hunting success rate ===
Common name	Family	Preferred hunting style	Image	Hunting success rate	Source
Wolf	Canidae	Pack hunting		20%	
Spotted hyena	Hyaenidae	Pack hunting and pursuit predation		30.5%	
Peregrine falcon	Falconidae	Pursuit predation		47%	
Great white shark	Lamnidae	Ambush		48%	
Dhole	Canidae	Pack hunting		20%	
Harbour porpoise	Phocoenidae	Pursuit predation		90%	
Cat	Felidae	Ambush		30%	
Dragonfly	Odonata	Pursuit predation		76–97%	
Leopard	Felidae	Ambush		14–38%	
Lion	Felidae	Pack hunting and ambush		8.3–57.1%	
African wild dog	Canidae	Pack hunting and pursuit predation		21–100% (31.2% mean)	
Cheetah	Felidae	Pursuit predation		20.2–100% (43.4% mean)	
Black-footed cat	Felidae	Ambush		60%	
Tiger	Felidae	Ambush		5–50%	
Seahorse	Sygnathidae	Ambush		84-94%	
Horsfield's tarsier	Tarsiidae	Ambush		88%	

=== Reasons for high hunting success ===
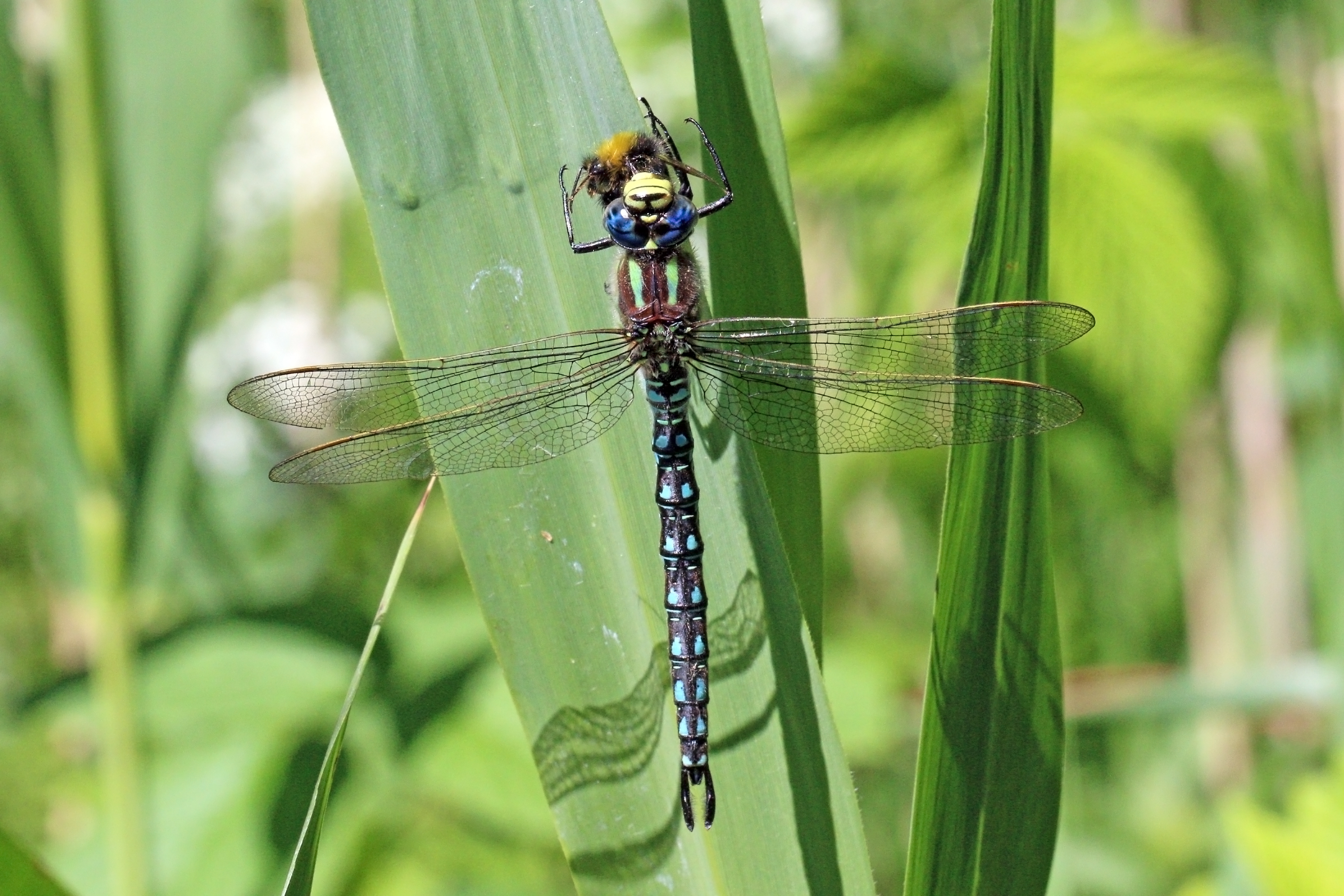
Dragonflies having the highest hunting success of any animal, varying anywhere from 90 to 97%

Most mammals have a hunting success below 50% but some mammals such as African wild dogs and harbour porpoises can have hunting success rates of over 90%. The African wild dog is one of the most effective hunters on earth, with hunting success reaching a maximum of 90%. Their high levels of hunting success is due to their highly co-operative hunting behaviour accompanied with high stamina. Wild dogs typically use their stamina to exhaust their prey, which are usually caught after a chase lasting an average of 2 km (1.2 mi). The wild dog's stamina and the prey animal's exhaustion are the driving factors that cause most successful hunts. Harbour porpoises are not usually social but on multiple occasions they've been recorded hunting cooperatively. The average group size consists of about two individuals. Using echolocation, they locate prey and capture them. They continuously forage throughout the day and night to meet their body requirements. It is hypothesized that harbour porpoises eat large amounts of food, about 10% of their own body mass. Another theory suggests that harbour porpoises require relatively large energy-rich prey, with high hunting success rates to meet their estimated metabolic requirements.

Dragonflies have the highest observed hunting success of any animal, with success rates as high as 97%. They are also opportunistic and pursue a variety of prey. Predatory performance may have consequences in terms of energetics, mortality and potential loss of feeding or mating territories. The reason for their hunting success is due to many unique evolutionary adaptations, which includes aspects of eyesight and flight. In terms of flight, dragonflies can independently control their fore and hind wings, they can also hover and fly in any direction, including backwards. They can fixate on their prey and predict its next move, catching it midair with extreme accuracy. Each of a dragonfly's eyes is made up of thousands of units known as ommatidia that run across its head. This gives them almost 360-degree-vision, which helps them spot prey more efficiently.

The black-footed cat has one of the highest hunting success of any member of family Felidae. In 1993, a female and male were observed for 622 hours, a kill was made every 50 minutes and they had a hunting success of 60%. A total of 550 animals were consumed. About 14 small animals were caught each night. Their hunting success is due to their hunting behaviour and frequency of initiated hunts. They use three different ways of hunting, which includes "fast hunting", "slow hunting" and "sit and wait" hunt. They use these three hunting strategies to ambush or pursue their prey which mostly includes small mammals, insects and small birds.

It seems that a predator speed relative to prey speed and other predators speed, is another factor influencing the hunting success. In Serengeti, cheetahs have a hunting success rate of 70% hunting Thomson gazelles, compared to 57% of African wild dogs, 33% of spotted hyenas and jackals, and 26% of lions. In Okavango delta, cheetahs have a hunting success of 26% when hunting impalas, compared to 15.5% of African wild dogs. In Kruger National Park, cheetahs have a hunting success of 20.7% hunting impalas, compared to 16% of the leopards.

Cougars have a hunting success rate of 82% hunting elks and mule deers in the snow, while Siberian tigers hunting Manchurian wapitis in the snow have a hunting success of 30%. Grey wolves have a hunting success rate of 26% hunting elks in the snow.

== Kill rates ==
The quantity of prey killed over a certain period by an individual predator is referred to as "kill rate". Changes in kill rates due to shifting prey density may predict the carrying capacity of predator populations, and also the extant to which predation effects the stability of prey populations. Large predators such as the wolf, cougar, jaguar, tiger, and leopard have been the subjects of kill rate studies. In the cougar, an analysis of foraging studies revealed that factors such as biological sex, reproductive status, prey biodiversity and density, interspecific kleptoparasitism, intraspecific competition and human presence, impact kill rates. Mean kill rates for adult males, rearing females, and solitary females, were 0.84, 1.24, and 0.99 ungulates per week, respectively. Rearing females in Northern California were reported to have the highest kill rates, at 2.35 ungulates per week.

== Factors influencing success ==
=== Selective feeding ===
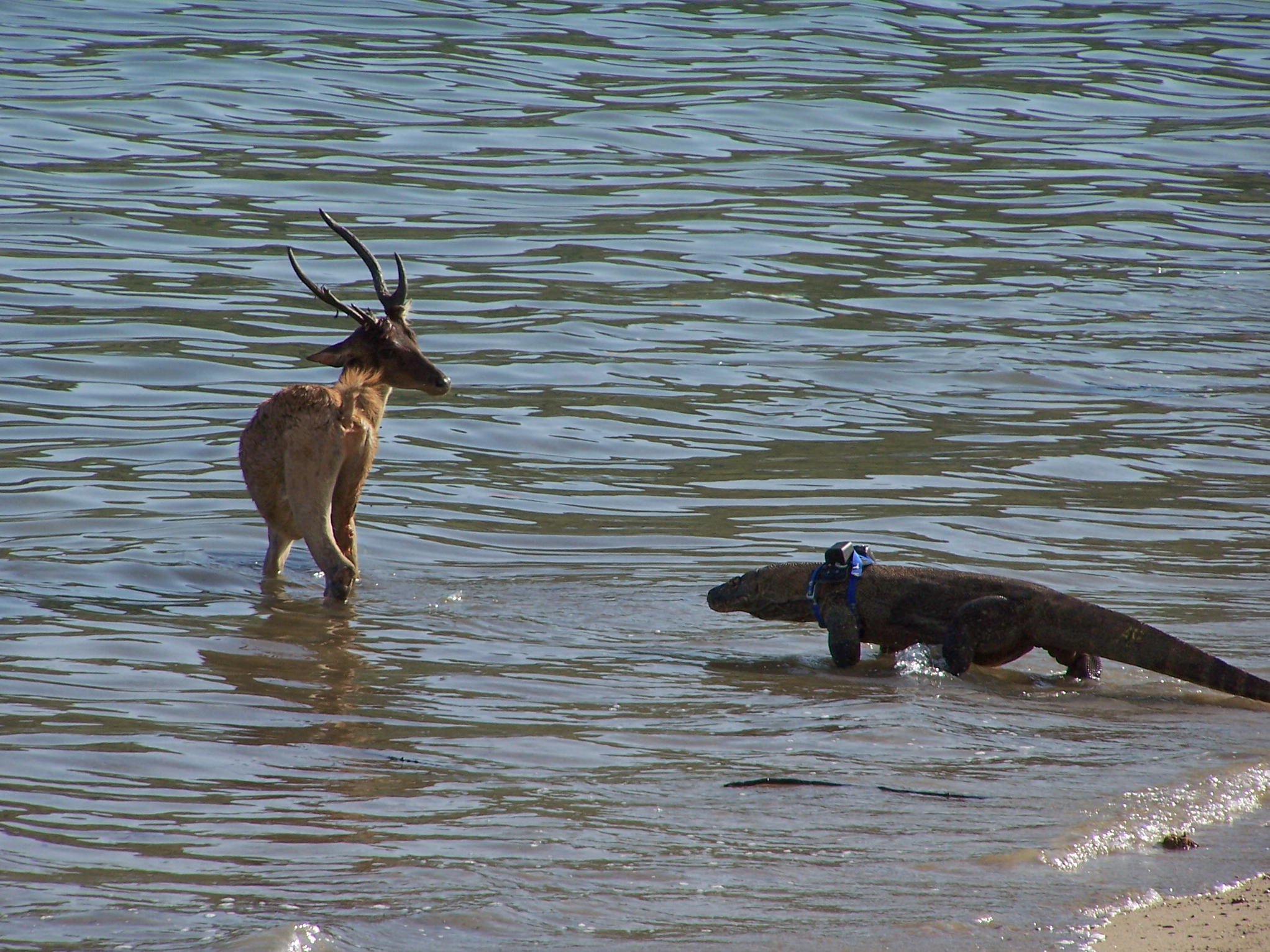
Komodo dragon stalking a deer

Hunting success depends on the distance or time the predator has to catch its prey, comparable to the distance (time) that the prey has to escape. In the wild, a discrepancy is observed between the carnivore's low hunting success and highly selective predation on ill animals. This behaviour may be described by the co-adaptive evolution of predator and prey. A predator like a wolf cannot always hunt a given deer, because an error in prey choice can lead to energy loss, injury and even death. Predators tend to seek vulnerable prey, and this is the basis of the selective impact of predators on the population of prey species. The low hunting success rate of wild carnivores, may be due to the fact that identification of potentially vulnerable prey from distance is imperfect, the more so that the behaviour of prey compensate for its poor health. In the wild, the capacity for distinguishing odors or a slight difference in prey behaviour are influenced by a number of factors, such as wind strength and direction, the body condition and features of the predator, its experience, conditions for pursuing prey and much more. The microbiota (metabolites at the surface of the body) in animals exposed to long-term stress are responsible for their specific stress odor, this allows predators to evaluate the vulnerability of its potential prey. The causes of reduced health differs and depends on the individual animal's sensitivity to several biotic and abiotic factors such as endogenous, infectious, and parasitic diseases, intra- and interspecific interactions, etc. The host macro-organism, which is the microflora system helps predators to judge the state of its prey.

=== Social and solitary predators ===
Increased hunting success is a frequently cited benefit of group living in social predators and this is also a hypothesis for the evolution of sociality. However, previous research shows that the benefit of increased hunting success is only present in small groups. In several group hunting taxas, ranging from insects to primates, despite the cooperation among the hunters, the hunting success of the larger group size does not increase. Research shows that predator groups of 2–5 animals have the highest hunting success rates, then levels off, or even declines, across larger groups. It has been theorised that the hunting success of predators hunting formidable prey increases with group size. This pattern is caused by the increased cooperation in large groups due to the much lower chance a solitary predator has against such prey. The low hunting success of solitary predators promotes cooperation because an extra hunter can sufficiently improve group hunting success to avoid the risk of injury and energy loss.

=== Hunting methods ===
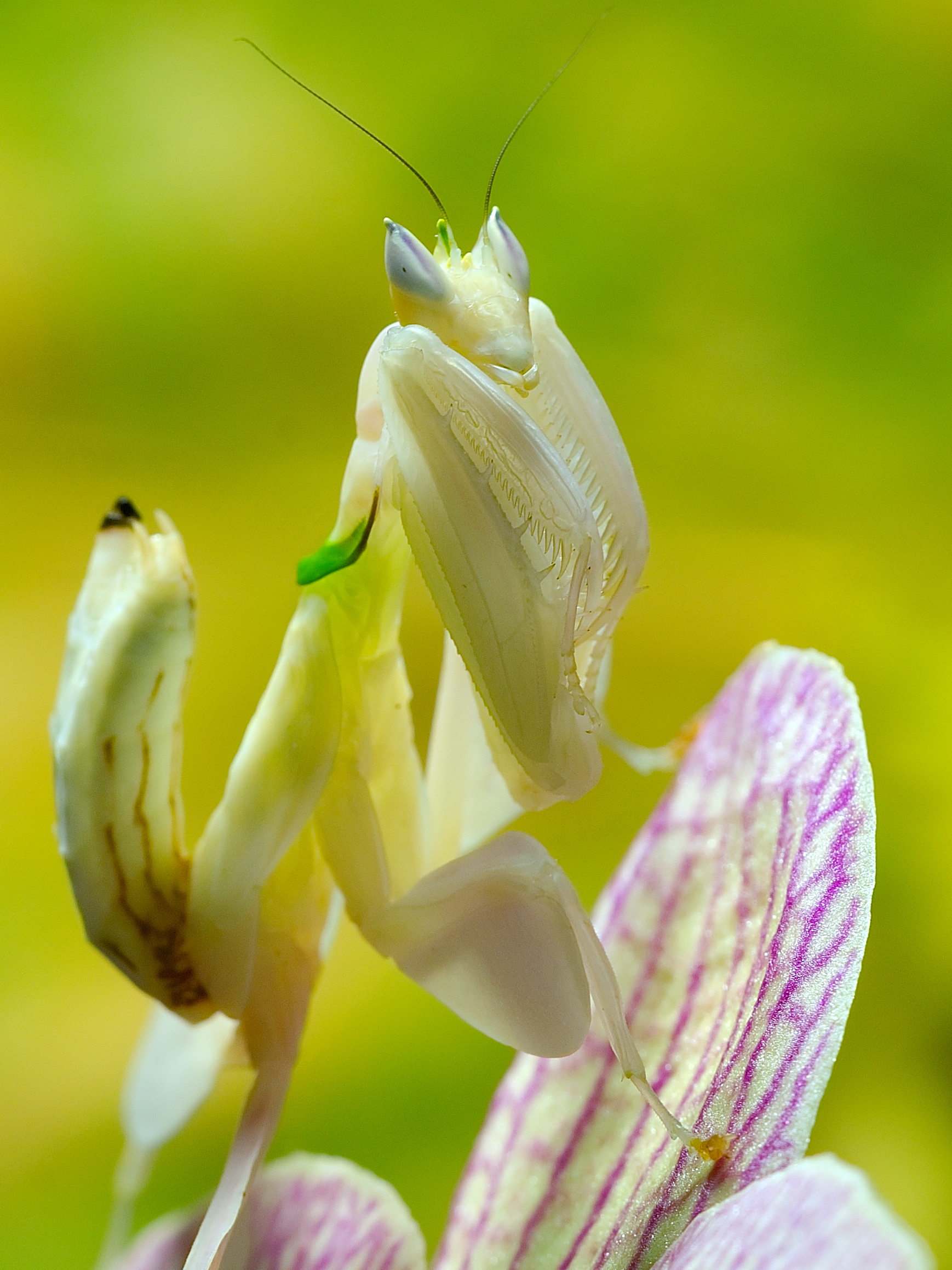
The Orchid mantis uses its camouflage to ambush its prey.

Field studies show that different predator hunting methods (ambush, pursuit predation, etc.) can lead to distinct number of individuals or prey captured. Due to this, predators with different hunting strategies can cause competing trophic cascades and function at different trophic levels. Predators are often classified as active or sit-and-wait predators by their average hunting behaviour. The locomotor crossover hypothesis states that ambush predators should have more success when hunting fast-moving prey, whereas cursorial predators should be more successful when hunting sedentary prey. Studies reveal that starvation can cause an ambush predator to adopt a pursuit predation hunting method, though ambush predators regularly switch to pursuit predation when prey densities are lower. Experiments show that differences in prey's anti-predator responses to the environment can influence predator behaviour or success. Field observations show that predators can alter their hunting behaviour at larger scales according to prey behaviour, but at smaller scales they seek specific locations where they can facilitate hunting.

=== Environmental influences ===
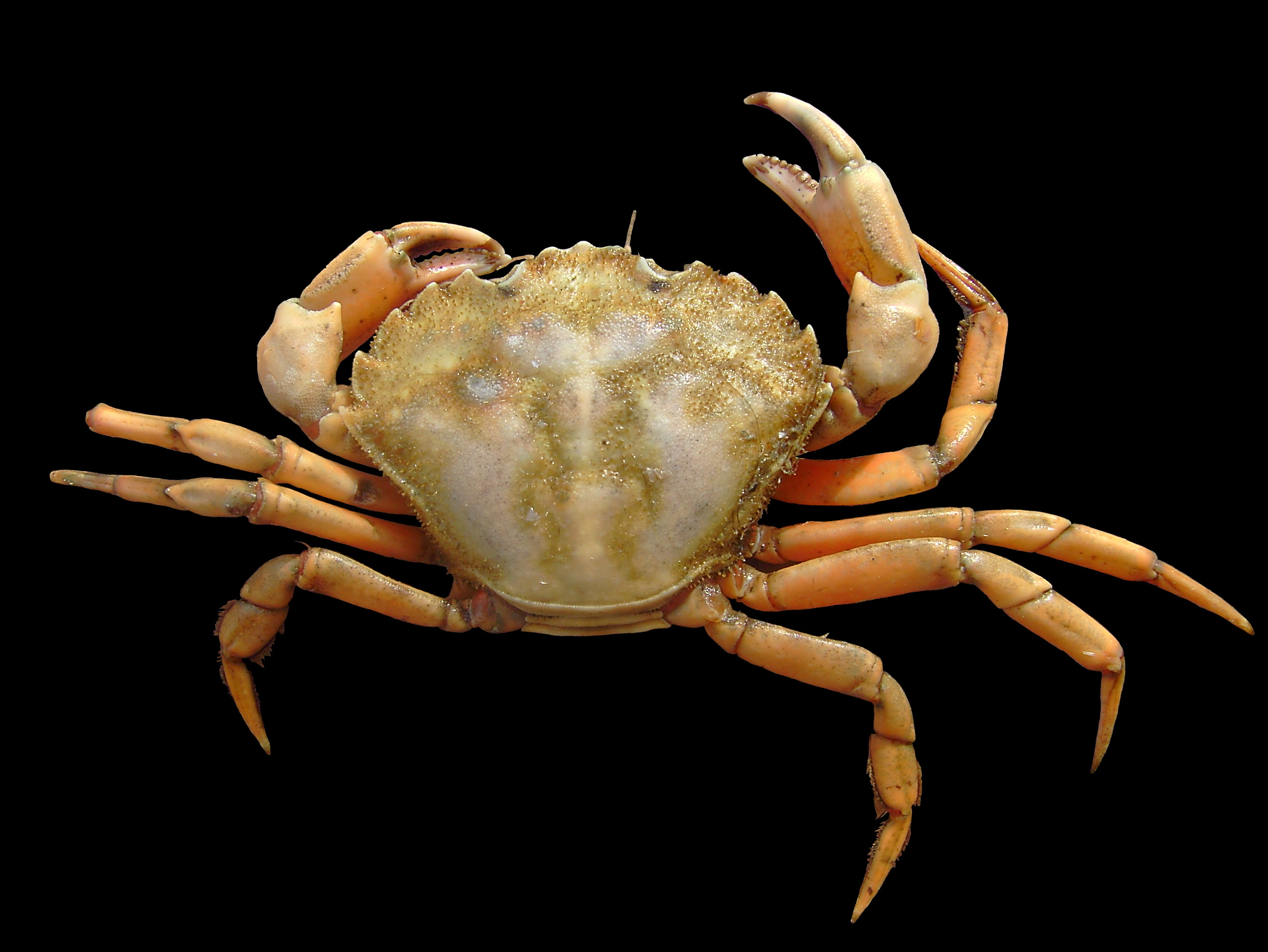
Green crabs can be affected by environmental conditions such as high flow velocities

Conditions in the environment have an influence on a predator's ability to detect prey and vice versa. A primary mechanism is the limiting of foraging time obtained by mobile predators due to the risk of unfavourable conditions. The importance of predators on community functioning in gentle environments, an effect which reduces in stressful situations. Hydrodynamic stress associated with waves decreases the predator's success, as these conditions restrict predator mobility and foraging activity. Environmental conditions may impair a predator's ability to find or consume prey. For instance, green crab predation drastically decreased in the vicinity of the Damariscotta River with high flow celerities, though they were found at greater densities in high flow rates. Similar incidents happened when fish, insects and copepods exhibited much lower foraging success in more rapid flows. As a result, environmental conditions can influence predators by reducing their ability to find or handle prey. Behavioural research shows that environmental conditions like hydrodynamics can have a big effect in systems where predators rely on chemical cues to find their prey.

=== Vegetative cover ===
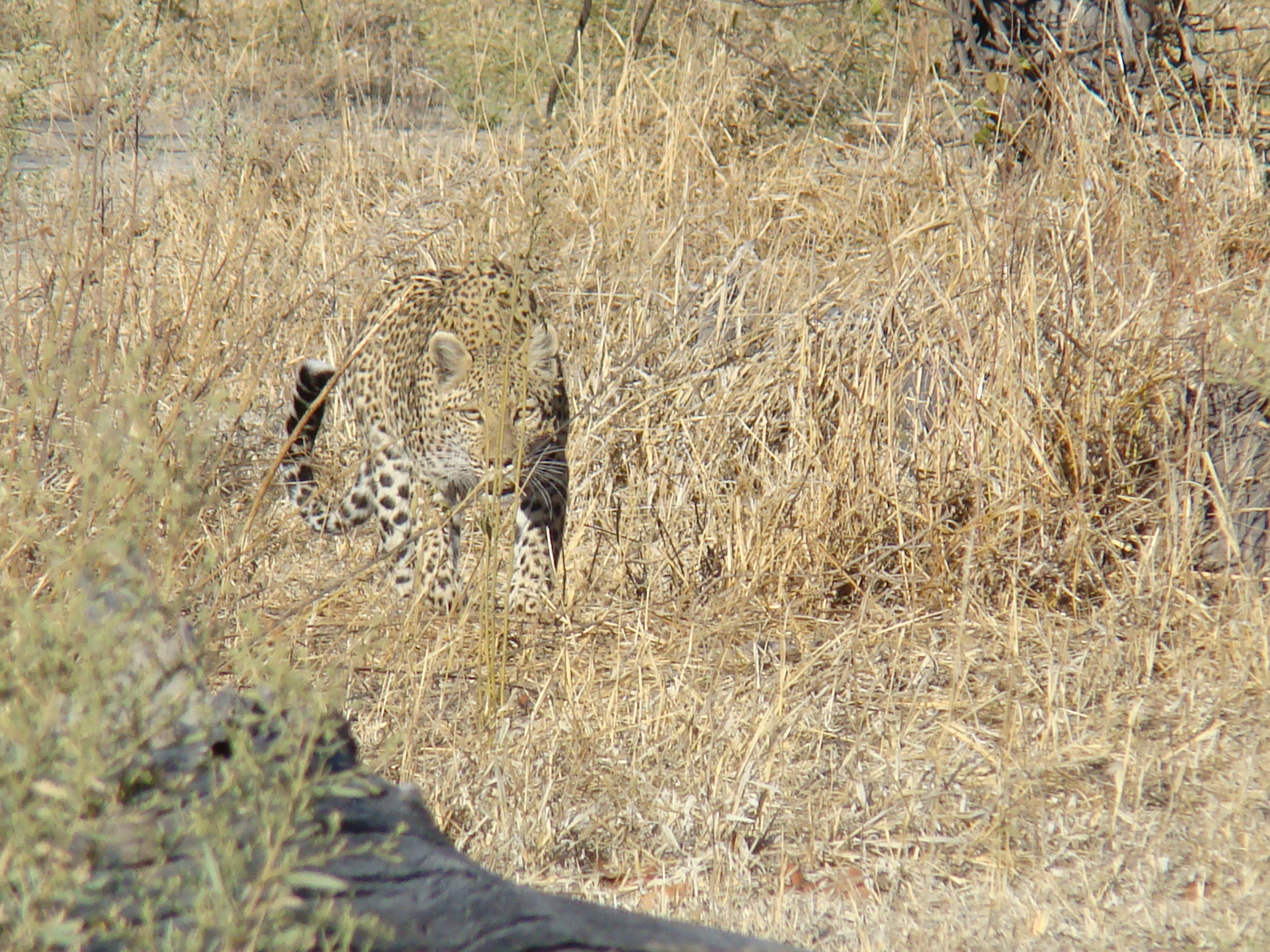
Vegetative cover can be important when hunting, especially in ambush predators.

A predator's hunting behaviour is suited for hunting in specific types of vegetative cover and is thus a largely custom characteristic in taxonomic families. Felids for instance typically use dense cover to stalk or ambush prey, whereas canids do not use vegetative cover when hunting. Sympatric predators like the Canada lynx and the coyote were tracked in the snow for three seasonal winters and hunting behaviour in relation to vegetative cover was studied. The main prey for both species were snowshoe hares, the lynx pursued hares more frequently in sparse white spruce canopies than coyotes, on the other hand coyotes pursued hares more in dense spruce than lynxes. It is thought that the hunting behaviour of lynxes varies according to cover, while that of coyotes is fixed. However, coyotes appeared to use cover to their advantage when stalking hares, possibly an influence of snow on the hunting methods of each of the predator species.

== In human hunters ==
=== Hunting success in humans ===
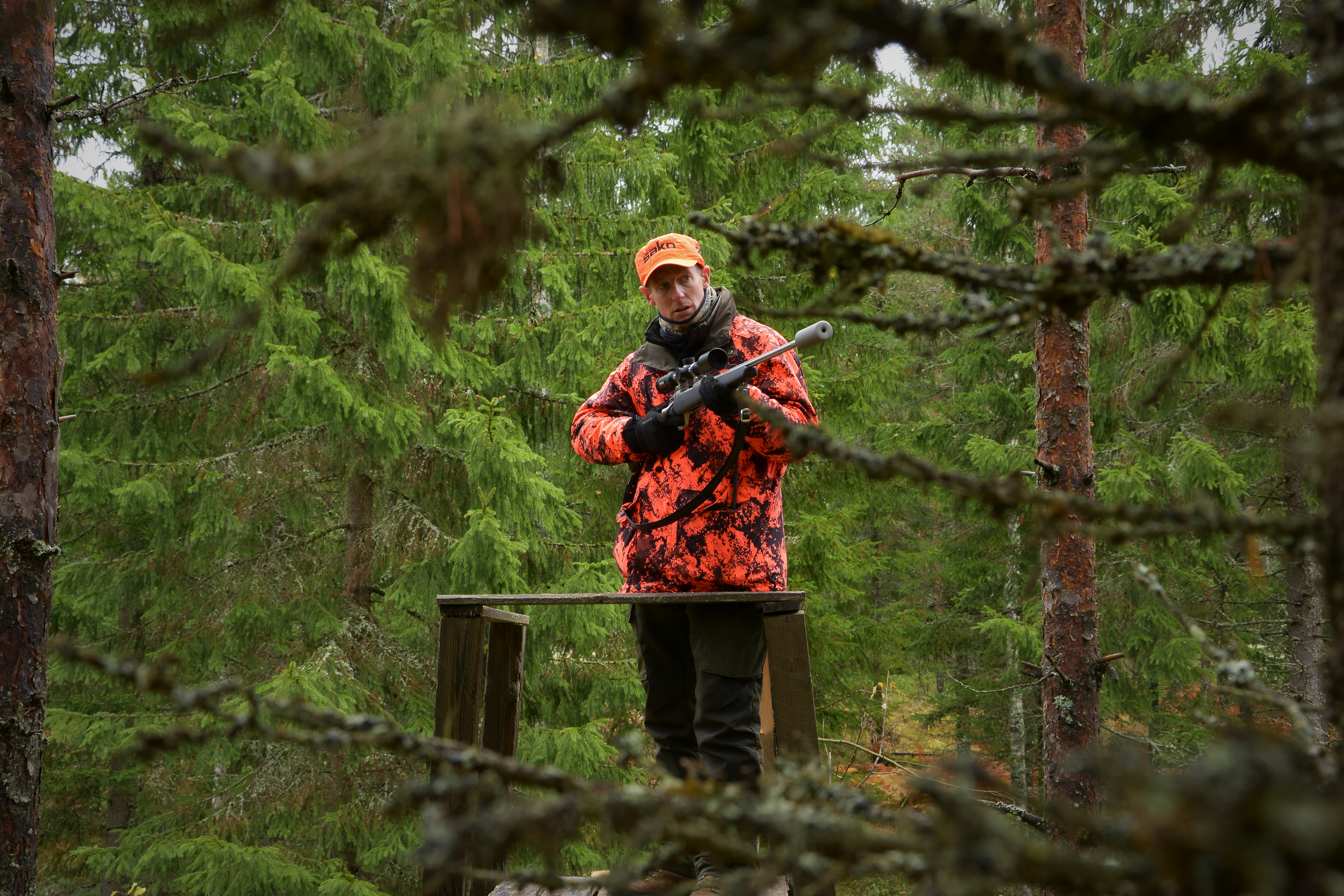
As in other animals, hunting success in humans differ considerably.

Hunting success in humans differ in methods used, selected prey, the performance of the hunter, weather conditions, etc. A study showed that hunters who used dogs had a hunting success of 60%, while those who employed persistent hunting had a hunting success of 37–100% over 15 attempted hunts. Hunters who hunted with bows and arrows had a hunting success of only 5%, whereas others who hunted with springhare probe had a hunting success of 14% and yet others who used clubs and spears had a success rate of 45%. The study was based on the hunting methods of the bushmen in southern Africa.

=== Factors influencing success of human hunters ===
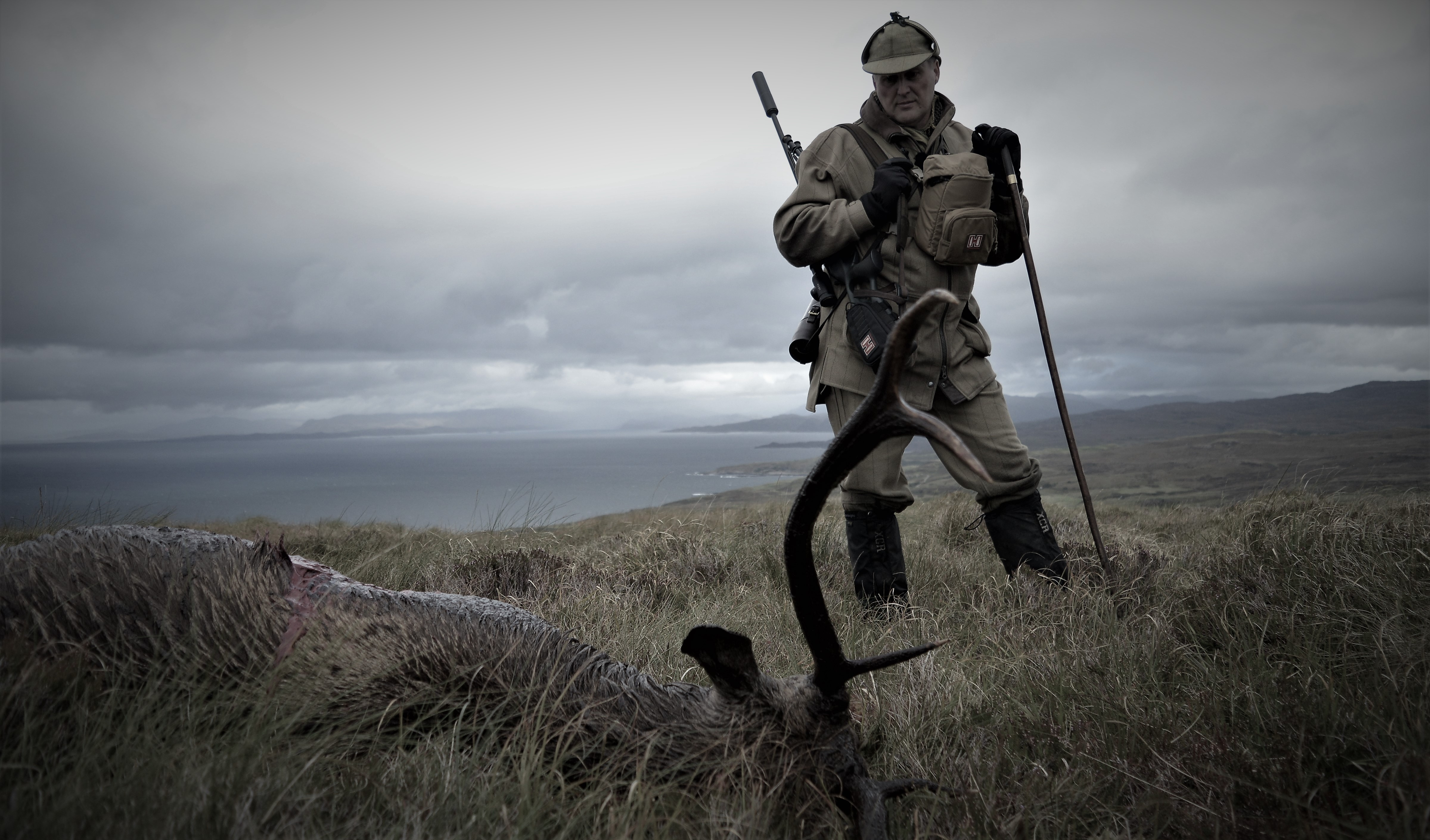
Professional deerstalker standing next to a red deer stag carcass

In Kentucky, US, a study was conducted about the factors influencing the flush and hunting success of hunters in three game species which were ruffed grouse, northern bobwhite and the cottontail rabbit. Encounter rates may have effects on population dynamics, hunter satisfaction, and hunter retention. In a 12-year span between 2003 and 2015, there were about 3,948 grouse hunts, 19,301 rabbit hunts, and 4,798 bobwhite hunts took place. In this case, hunting success was defined as the number of animals a hunting party flushed out. Hunting success was expected to increase over the hunting season due to cover being reduced and weather being more hospitable for upland hunting. Hunting was usually enhanced when more hunters and dogs were introduced to hunting parties.

=== Hunting types and methods ===
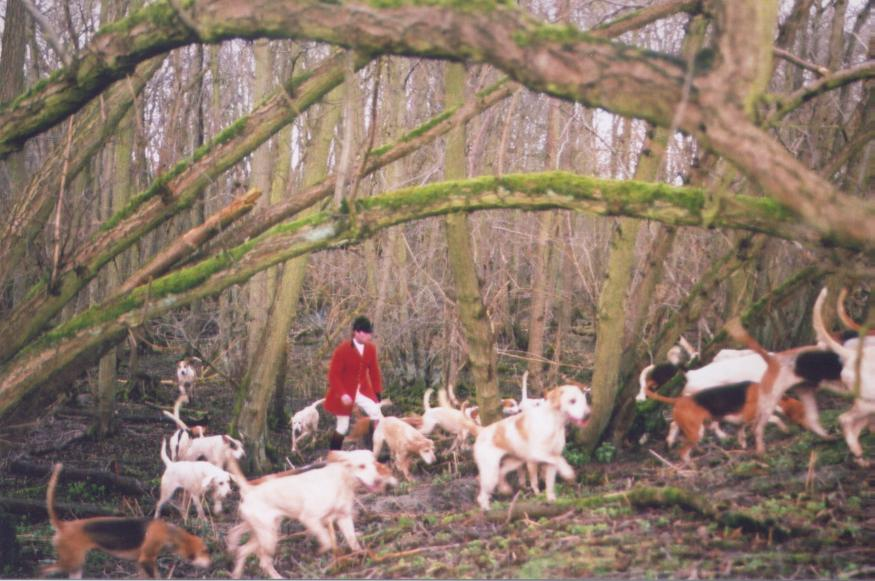
Hunting in Yorkshire, northern England, in 2005, on the last day of fully legal, proper, fox hunting.

There are many types of hunting that human hunters employ, these types include recreational hunting (e.g. trophy hunting), medium/small game hunting (e.g. deer hunting), fowling, pest control/nuisance management, commercial hunting (e.g. whaling) and poaching. In terms of hunting methods 24 methods are used. This methods include baiting (i.e. the use of baits to lure animals), battue (i.e. scaring animals into a killing zone), beagling (i.e. using beagles in hunts), the use of camouflage to hunt, shooting, the use of dogs, persistence hunting (i.e. use of stamina to exhaust prey), stalking and much more. Modern regulations differentiate between lawful hunting and illegal poaching, where uncontrolled hunting of animals occur.

Historical, substinence, and sport hunting can greatly differ, with modern hunting regulations addressing the issues of hunting and the most sustainable way to hunt. Techniques vary between government regulations, a hunter's personal ethics, local practices, hunting equipment, and the target animal species. Hunters may use a combined of two or more hunting techniques, though law may forbid hunters from using techniques common in activities like poaching and wildlife management.

=== Impact ===
The exploitation of animal species currently threatens many species with extinction. Particularly in tropical rainforests, where hunting for food poses the most severe threat to many species in tropical rainforests. In some cases, Piro shortgun hunters took a limited number of shotgun cartridges on hunting trips, and they usually pay no attention to less profitable prey early in the trip, when the chance for more profitable prey becomes more likely. Human disturbance can influence the behaviour of wild animals, which can have inferences for wildlife populations. For example, in Northeastern Gabon, studies show that hunting and human disturbance decreased the population of large mammals near roads and in more populated areas. In particular, primates like chimpanzees and mandrills were found far from the roads, this could possibly be due to more intense hunting of these species for either bushmeat or in retaliation for crop raiding. Most large predators have been extirpated from the range of the white-tailed deer, so hunters have now taken this predatory role. Hunters can indirectly affect prey species, indirect behavioural responses includes altered selection of resource, space use or movement. Deers realize that humans are a threat and adapt behavioural strategies by minimizing movement and showing high resistancy times in established ranges, factors that influence harvest susceptibility.

== See also ==
- Pursuit predation
- Pack hunting
- Trophic level
- Anti-predator adaptation
