= Theory choice =

Problem in the philosophy of science

Theory choice was a main problem in the philosophy of science in the early 20th century, and under the impact of the new and controversial theories of relativity and quantum physics, came to involve how scientists should choose between competing theories.

The classical answer would be to select the theory which was best verified, against which Karl Popper argued that competing theories should be subjected to comparative tests and the one chosen which survived the tests. If two theories could not, for practical reasons, be tested one should prefer the one with the highest degree of empirical content, said Popper in The Logic of Scientific Discovery.

Mathematician and physicist Henri Poincaré instead, like many others, proposed simplicity as a criterion. One should choose the mathematically simplest or most elegant approach. Many have sympathized with this view, but the problem is that the idea of simplicity is highly intuitive and even personal, and that no one has managed to formulate it in precise and acceptable terms.

Popper's solution was subsequently criticized by Thomas S. Kuhn in The Structure of Scientific Revolutions. He denied that competing theories (or paradigms) could be compared in the way that Popper had claimed, and substituted instead what can be briefly described as pragmatic success. This led to an intense discussion with Imre Lakatos and Paul Feyerabend the best known participants.

The discussion has continued, but no general and uncontroversial solution to the problem of formulating objective criteria to decide which is the best theory has so far been formulated. The main criteria usually proposed are to choose the theory which provides the best (and novel) predictions, the one with the highest explanatory potential, the one which offers better problems or the most elegant and simple one. Alternatively a theory may be preferable if it is better integrated into the rest of contemporary knowledge.
