= Arditi–Ginzburg equations =

The Arditi–Ginzburg equations describe ratio-dependent predator–prey dynamics. Where N is the population of a prey species and P that of a predator, the population dynamics are described by the following two equations:
$$\begin{align}
\frac{dN}{dt} & = f(N)\,N-g{\left(\!\tfrac N P \!\right)}P \\[4pt]
\frac{dP}{dt} & = e \,g{\left(\!\tfrac N P\! \right)}P-uP
\end{align}$$

Here f(N) captures any change in the prey population not due to predator activity including inherent birth and death rates. The per capita effect of predators on the prey population (the harvest rate) is modeled by a function g which is a function of the ratio N/P of prey to predators. Predators receive a reproductive payoff, e, for consuming prey, and die at rate u. Making predation pressure a function of the ratio of prey to predators contrasts with the prey-dependent Lotka–Volterra equations, where the per capita effect of predators on the prey population is simply a function of the magnitude of the prey population g(N). Because the number of prey harvested by each predator decreases as predators become more dense, ratio-dependent predation is a way of incorporating predator intraspecific competition for food. Ratio-dependent predation may account for heterogeneity in large-scale natural systems in which predator efficiency decreases when prey is scarce. The merit of ratio-dependent versus prey-dependent models of predation has been the subject of much controversy, especially between the biologists Lev R. Ginzburg and Peter A. Abrams. Ginzburg purports that ratio-dependent models more accurately depict predator-prey interactions while Abrams maintains that these models make unwarranted complicating assumptions. A later review critically examines the claims made about ratio-dependent predation to find that the added value of the ratio-dependent predation models is unclear and concludes that "As empirical evidence is often lacking on both functional responses and the importance of functional responses for population dynamics, there is no need to strongly favor one limit model over the others." A recent ecology undergraduate textbook devotes about equal space to Lotka-Volterra and Arditi-Ginzburg equations. Neither prey-dependent nor ratio-dependent models can claim universal accuracy but the issue is to identify which is least wrong.

== See also ==
- Lotka–Volterra equation
- Population dynamics
