= Michael Rosenzweig =

Ecologist at the University of Arizona

Michael L. Rosenzweig (born 1941) is a professor of ecology and evolutionary biology at the University of Arizona. He developed and popularized the concept of reconciliation ecology. He received his Ph.D. in zoology at the University of Pennsylvania in 1966 and has held a number of academic positions around the United States.

Rosenzweig arrived upon an idea similar to Leigh Van Valen's Red Queen metaphor during the same year 1971 as Van Valen, calling his idea "the rat race."

Rosenzweig has a large body of editorial work spanning from 1977 to present, founding the journals Evolutionary Ecology and Evolutionary Ecology Research as well as the publishing house, Evolutionary Ecology Ltd. with the help of his wife Carole. When the Journal of Evolutionary Ecology was sold and the prices were to be raised, he stepped down from his editor in chief position and founded Evolutionary Ecology Ltd, which published the journal Evolutionary Ecology Research.

Rosenzweig's articles cover topics ranging from species diversity to predation dynamics and includes work on environmental issues and public policy. He has published three books on the origins and conservation of species diversity; both are for technical and general audiences. He received the Eminent Ecologist Award from the Ecological Society of America in 2008 which is given to a senior ecologist for significant contributions to the field of ecology.

== Education ==
- Ph.D., Zoology: University of Pennsylvania (1966)

== Positions ==
- Professor, Ecology and Evolutionary Biology; University of Arizona (1975–present)
- Visiting professor of Biology: Ben-Gurion University (1981–1982)
- Visiting professor of Zoology: University of Wisconsin (1990–1991)
- Associate Professor of Biology: University of New Mexico (1971–1975)
- Assistant Professor of Biology: SUNY-Albany (1969–1971)
- Visiting Assistant Professor: Cranberry Lake Biological Station, SUNY-Albany (1969)
- Assistant Professor of Biology: Bucknell University, Lewisbug, PA, (1965–1969)

== Awards ==
- Ecological Society of America: Eminent Ecologist Award (2008)
- Faculty of Science, University of Arizona: Career Teaching Award (2001)
- Ninth Lukacs Symp: Twentieth Century Distinguished Service Award (1999)
- International Ecological Society: Distinguished Statistical Ecologist (1998)
- Udall Center for Studies in Public Policy, University of Arizona: Fellow (1997–1998)
- Mountain Research Center, Montana State University: Distinguished Lecturer (1997)
- University of Umeå, Sweden: Distinguished Visiting Scholar (1997)
- University of Miami: Distinguished Visiting Professor (1996–1997)
- University of British Columbia: Dennis Chitty Lecturer (1995–1996)
- Iowa State University: 30th Paul L. Errington Memorial Lecturer (1994)
- Michigan State University, Kellogg Biological Station: Eminent Ecologist (1992)
- Ben-Gurion University of the Negev, Israel: Jacob Blaustein Scholar (1992)
- University Wisconsin, Madison: Brittingham Fellow (1990–1991)
- Monash University, Melbourne, Australia: The Jock Marshall Fellow (1989)
- Australian Academy of Science: The Rudi Lemberg Travelling Fellow (1988–1989)
- Society for the Study of Evolution: Vice-president (1988–1989)
- Amer Society Zoologists: Outstanding Service Award (1986)
- Amer Society Zoologists: Chair, Division of Ecology (1985–1986)
- College of Science, University of Arizona: Outstanding Teaching Award (1985)
- University of Miami: Distinguished Visiting Professor (1983)
- Society for the Study of Evolution: Counselor (1981–1983)
- UC San Diego: Distinguished Visiting Scholar (1977)

== Editorial work ==
- Ecological Society of America: editorial board (1977–present)
- Chapman & Hall's services of Population Biology: Editor (1979–1986)
- Paleobiology: editor (1983–1986)
- Israel Journal of Zoology: Editor (1993-)
- Evolutionary Ecology: Founder, Editor-in-chief (1986 – unknown)
- Evolutionary Ecology Research: Founder, Editor-in-chief (unknown – present)

== Books ==
- And Replenish the Earth: Harper & Row (1974)
- Species Diversity in Space & Time: Cambridge University (1995)
