= Functional response =

Ecological concept; intake rate of a consumer as a function of food density

A functional response in ecology is the intake rate of a consumer as a function of food density (the amount of food available in a given ecotope). It is associated with the numerical response, which is the reproduction rate of a consumer as a function of food density. Following C. S. Holling, functional responses are generally classified into three types, which are called Holling's type I, II, and III. These were formulated using laboratory experiments where participants collected disks from a board of increasing disk density. Thus, the resulting formulae are often referred to as Holling's Disk Equations.

Types I, II, and III functional responses

== Type I ==
The type I functional response assumes a linear increase in intake rate with food density, either for all food densities, or only for food densities up to a maximum, beyond which the intake rate is constant. The linear increase assumes that the time needed by the consumer to process a food item is negligible, or that consuming food does not interfere with searching for food. A functional response of type I is used in the Lotka–Volterra predator–prey model. It was the first kind of functional response described and is also the simplest of the three functional responses currently detailed.

== Type II ==
The type II functional response is characterized by a decelerating intake rate, which follows from the assumption that the consumer is limited by its capacity to process food. Type II functional response is often modelled by a rectangular hyperbola, for instance as by Holling's disc equation, which assumes that processing of food and searching for food are mutually exclusive behaviours. The equation is

$$\begin{align}
f(R) &= \frac{a R}{1 + a h R}
\end{align}$$

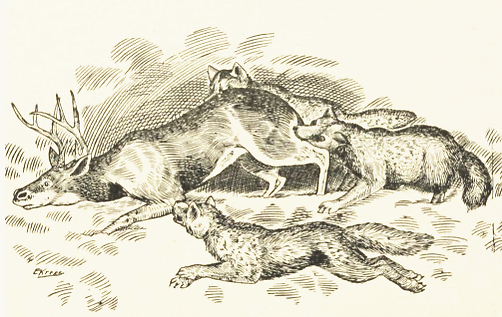
Wolves killing Caribou, by Arthur Robert Harding, 1909. If the caribou density increases whilst the number of wolves is held constant, the number of caribou killed per wolf first increases, then levels off.

where f denotes intake rate and R denotes food (or resource) density. The rate at which the consumer encounters food items per unit of food density is called the attack rate, a. The average time spent on processing a food item is called the handling time, h. Similar equations are the Monod equation for the growth of microorganisms and the Michaelis–Menten equation for the rate of enzymatic reactions.

In an example with wolves and caribou, as the number of caribou increases while holding wolves constant, the number of caribou kills increases and then levels off. This is because the proportion of caribou killed per wolf decreases as caribou density increases. The higher the density of caribou, the smaller the proportion of caribou killed per wolf. Explained slightly differently, at very high caribou densities, wolves need very little time to find prey and spend almost all their time handling prey and very little time searching. Wolves are then satiated and the total number of caribou kills reaches a plateau.

== Type III ==
The type III functional response is similar to type II in that at high levels of prey density, saturation occurs. At low prey density levels, the graphical relationship of number of prey consumed and the density of the prey population is a super-linearly increasing function of prey consumed by predators:

$$\begin{align}
f(R) &= \frac{a R^k}{1 + a h R^k}, \;\;\;\;\;\;\; k > 1
\end{align}$$

This accelerating function was originally formulated in analogy with of the kinetics of an enzyme with two binding sites for k = 2. More generally, if a prey type is only accepted after every k encounters and rejected the k-1 times in between, which mimics learning, the general form above is found.

Learning time is defined as the natural improvement of a predator's searching and attacking efficiency or the natural improvement in their handling efficiency as prey density increases. Imagine a prey density so small that the chance of a predator encountering that prey is extremely low. Because the predator finds prey so infrequently, it has not had enough experience to develop the best ways to capture and subdue that species of prey. Holling identified this mechanism in shrews and deer mice feeding on sawflies. At low numbers of sawfly cocoons per acre, deer mice especially experienced exponential growth in terms of the number of cocoons consumed per individual as the density of cocoons increased. The characteristic saturation point of the type III functional response was also observed in the deer mice. At a certain density of cocoons per acre, the consumption rate of the deer mice reached a saturation amount as the cocoon density continued to increase.

Prey switching involves two or more prey species and one predator species. When all prey species are at equal densities, the predator will indiscriminately select between prey species. However, if the density of one of the prey species decreases, then the predator will start selecting the other, more common prey species with a higher frequency because if it can increase the efficiency which with it captures the more abundant prey through learning. Murdoch demonstrated this effect with guppy preying on tubificids and fruit flies. As fruit fly numbers decreased guppies switched from feeding on the fruit flies on the water's surface to feeding on the more abundant tubificids along the bed.

If predators learn while foraging, but do not reject prey before they accept one, the functional response becomes a function of the density of all prey types. This describes predators that feed on multiple prey and dynamically switch from one prey type to another. This behaviour can lead to either a type II or a type III functional response. If the density of one prey type is approximately constant, as is often the case in experiments, a type III functional response is found. When the prey densities change in approximate proportion to each other, as is the case in most natural situations, a type II functional response is typically found. This explains why the type III functional response has been found in many experiments in which prey densities are artificially manipulated, but is rare in nature.

== See also ==
- Carnivore
- Ecosystem model
- Herbivore
- Lotka–Volterra equations
- Predator satiation
