= Delayed density dependence =

In population ecology delayed density dependence describes a situation where population growth is controlled by negative feedback operating with a time lag.

== Population cycles ==
Delayed density dependence has been used by ecologists to explain population cycles. Ecologists have been unable to successfully explain regular population cycles for many decades; delayed density dependence may hold the answer. Here populations are allowed to increase above their normal capacity because there is a time lag until negative feedback mechanisms bring the population back down. This effect has been used to explain the widely fluctuating population cycles of lemmings, forest insects as well as the population cycles of larger mammals such as moose and wolves. Other causes of population cycles include cycling abiotic factors.

== Causes ==
The causes of delayed density dependence vary in each situation. In lemmings, food supply and predation are the most important factors that lead to delayed density dependence. Competition between life stages is another cause. In some species of moth the practice of egg cannibalism takes place where older moths eat eggs of their own species. This produces imbalances in the population levels of different generations leading to delayed density dependence. Disease is another causative factor. The delay is introduced because of the time it takes for enough susceptible individuals to be present for the disease to spread again. The delay to sexual maturity introduces delayed density dependence in many instances. In this case there is density dependent inhibition applied to organisms when they are sexually immature. When this generation reaches sexual maturity there are fewer offspring, continuing the pattern.

== Methods of detection ==
Autocorrelation is the principal method by which delayed density dependence can be detected. Time series are analysed for repeating patterns.

== See also ==
- Density-dependent inhibition
- Population cycle
- Population dynamics
