= Aniara (disambiguation) =

Aniara is a poem by Swedish Nobel laureate Harry Martinson.

Aniara may also refer to:

== Biology ==
- Aniara (beetle), a genus of tiger beetles, containing only one species, Aniara sepulchralis
- Scopula aniara, a moth of the family Geometridae
- Adoxophyes aniara, a moth of the family Tortricidae

== Other uses ==
- Aniara (film), a 2018 film based on the Martinson poem
- Aniara (opera), a 1959 opera by Karl-Birger Blomdahl
- Aniara, the name of HD 102956, host star of an extrasolar planet

== See also ==
- Anniara Muñoz (born 1980), Cuban volleyball player
