= Pest insect population dynamics =

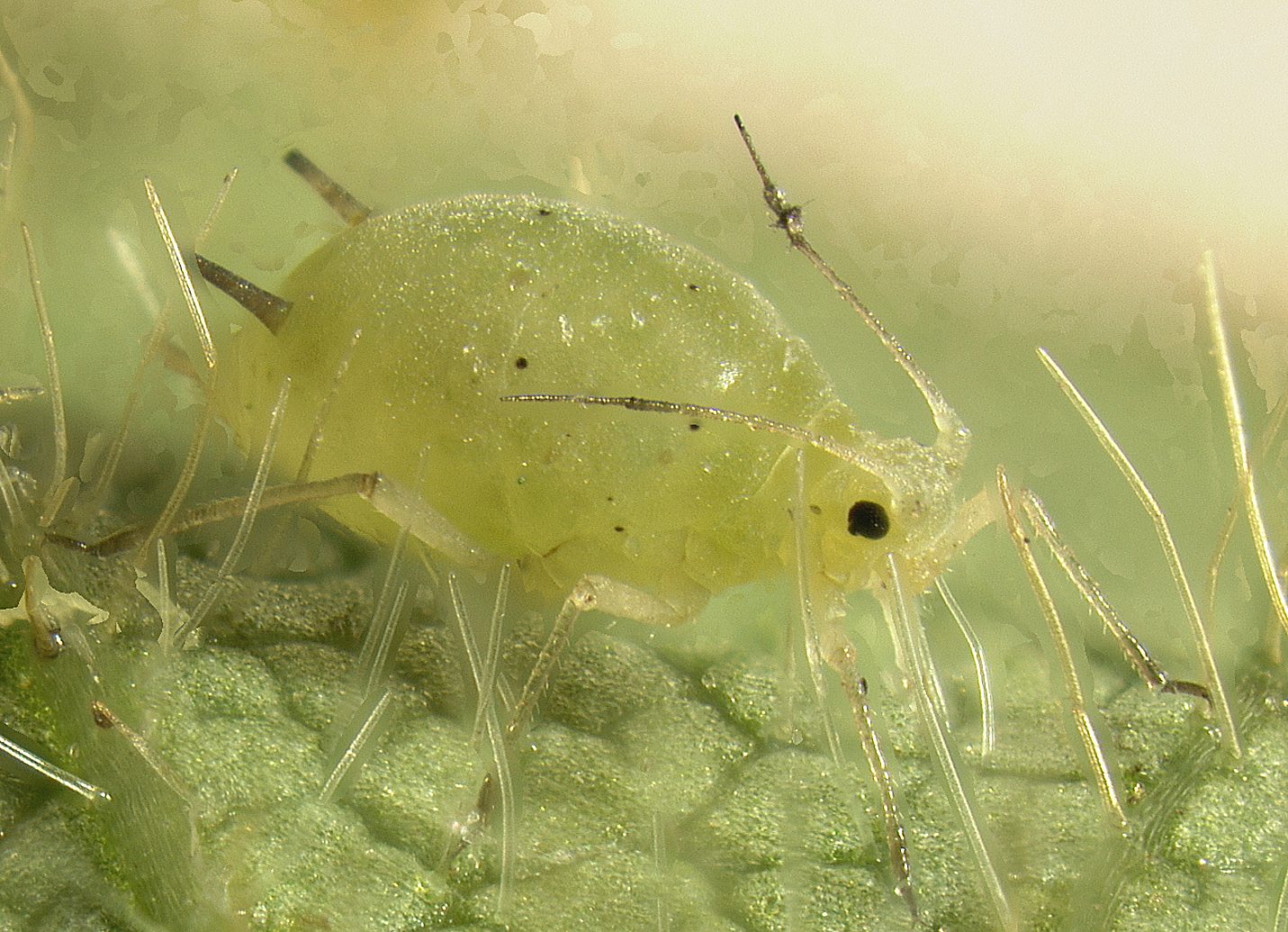
Soybean aphid

The population dynamics of pest insects is a subject of interest to farmers, agricultural economists, ecologists, and those concerned with animal welfare.

== Factors affecting populations ==
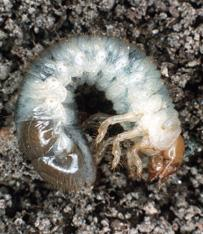
Japanese beetle larva

- Density-independent: Affect a population equally regardless of its density. Examples:
  - A winter freeze may kill a constant fraction of potato leafhoppers in a peanut field regardless of the total number of leafhoppers.
  - Japanese beetle larvae survive well with lots of summer rain.
  - Temperature, humidity, fires, storms, dissolved oxygen for aquatic species.
- Density-dependent: Affect a population more or less as the population is bigger. Examples:
  - A bigger population may be more vulnerable to diseases and parasites.
  - A bigger population may have more intraspecific competition, while a smaller population may have more interspecific competition.
  - Emigration from the population may increase as it becomes more crowded.

== Life tables ==
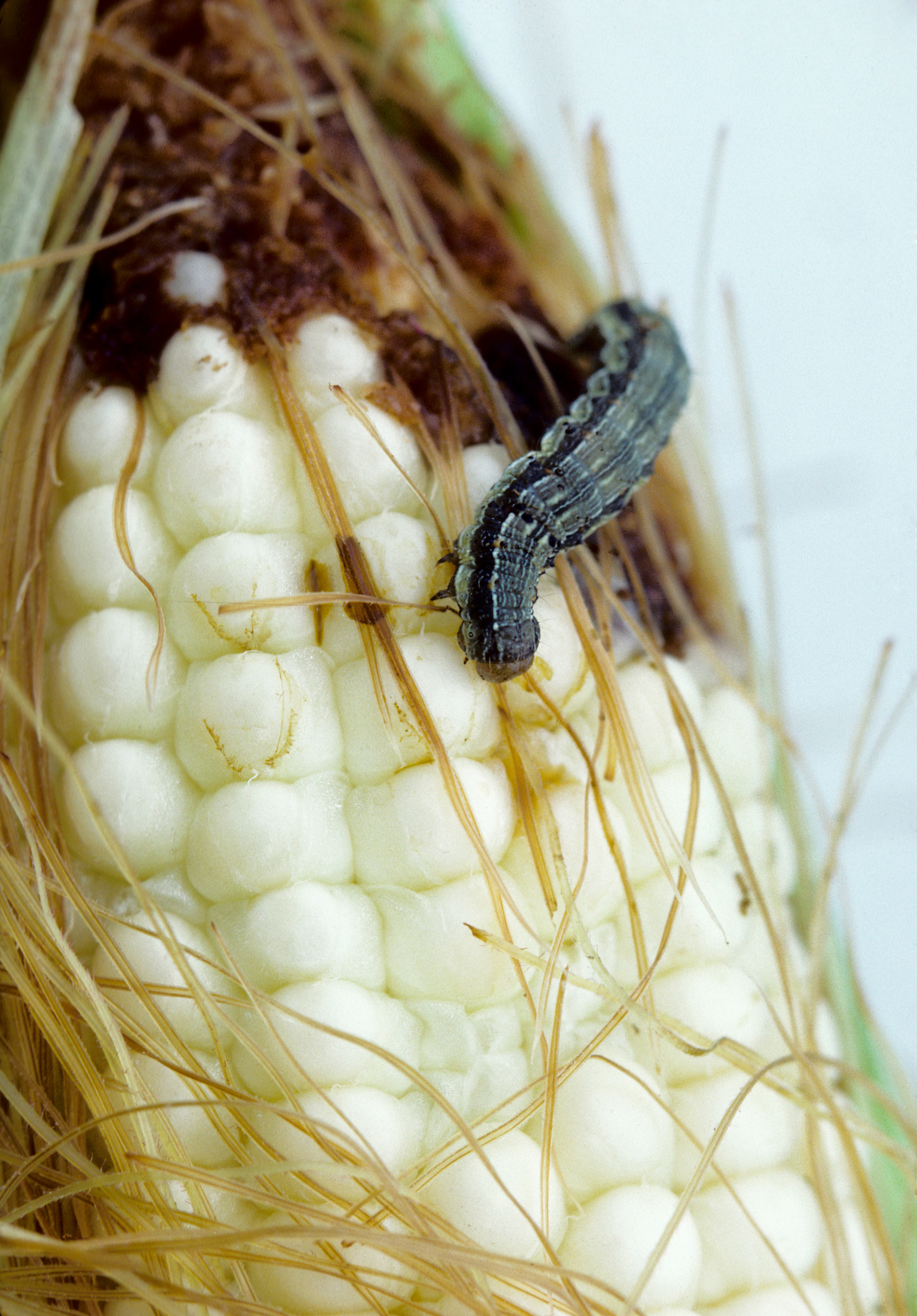
Helicoverpa zea larva feeding on corn

A life table shows how and how many insects die as they mature from eggs to adults. It helps with pest control by identifying at what life stage pest insects are most vulnerable and how mortality can be increased. A cohort life table tracks organisms through the stages of life, while a static life table shows the distribution of life stages among the population at a single point in time.

Following is an example of a cohort life table based on field data from Vargas and Nishida (1980). The overall mortality rate was 94.8%, but this is probably an underestimate because the study collected the pupae in cups, and these may have protected them from birds, mice, harsh weather, and so on.

Life table for corn earworm Heliothis zea, 10 October 1976 to 20 November 1976, adapted from Vargas and Nishida (1980)
Stage ($x$)	Number alive at stage ($a_x$)	Cause of mortality	Number dying	Proportion of original cohort surviving ($l_x$)	Proportion of original cohort dying ($d_x$)	Mortality rate at this step ($q_x$)
Egg	1000	Trichogramma confusum wasp parasitism	386	1	.386	.386
Egg	614	Orius insidiosus predation and unknown	232	.614	.232	.378
Larva 1	382	O. insidiosus, cannibalism, and unknown	90	.382	.090	.236
Larva 2	292	Cannibalism and unknown	59	.292	.059	.202
Larva 3	233	Cannibalism and unknown	34	.233	.034	.146
Larva 4	199	Cannibalism, disease, parasitism, and unknown	59	.199	.059	.296
Larva 5	140	Cannibalism, disease, parasitism, and unknown	69	.140	.069	.493
Larva 6	71	Cannibalism, disease, parasitism, and unknown	1	.071	.001	.014
Pupa	70	Disease and unknown	18	.070	.018	0.257
Adult	52 (28 male, 24 female)			.052		

=== Life expectancy ===
From a life table we can calculate life expectancy as follows. Assume the stages $x$ are uniformly spaced. The average proportion $L_x$ of organisms alive at stage $x$ between beginning and end is

$$L_x = \frac{l_x + l_{x+1}}{2}$$.

The total number $T_x$ of future stages to be lived by individuals at age $x$ and older is

$$T_x = L_x + L_{x+1} + L_{x+2} + ...$$.

Then the life expectancy $e_x$ at age $x$ is

$$e_x = \frac{T_x}{l_x}$$.

We could have done the same computation with raw numbers of individuals rather than proportions.

=== Basic reproductive rate ===
If we further know the number $F_x$ of eggs produced (fecundity) at age $x$, we can calculate the eggs produced per surviving individual $m_x$ as

$$m_x = \frac{F_x}{a_x}$$,

where $a_x$ is the number of individuals alive at that stage.

The basic reproductive rate $R_0$, also known as the replacement rate of a population, is the ratio of daughters to mothers. If it's greater than 1, the population is increasing. In a stable population the replacement rate should hover close to 1. We can calculate it from life-table data as

$$R_0 = \sum_x l_x m_x$$.

This is because each $l_x m_x$ product computes (first-generation parents at age $x$)/(first-generation eggs) times (second-generation eggs produced by age-$x$ parents)/(first-generation parents at age $x$).

If $N_0$ is the initial population size and $N_T$ is the population size after a generation, then

$$R_0 = \frac{N_T}{N_0}$$.

=== Generation time ===
The cohort generation time $T_c$ is the average duration between when a parent is born and when its child is born. If $x$ is measured in years, then

$$T_c = \frac{\sum_x x l_x m_x}{\sum_x l_x m_x}$$.

=== Intrinsic rate of increase ===
If $R_0$ remains relatively stable over generations, we can use it to approximate the intrinsic rate of increase $r$ for the population:

$$r \approx \frac{\ln R_0}{T_c}$$.

This is because

$$\ln R_0 = \ln \frac{N_T}{N_0} = \ln \frac{N_0 + \Delta N}{N_0} = \ln \left(1 + \frac{\Delta N}{N_0} \right) \approx \frac{\Delta N}{N_0}$$,

where the approximation follows from the Mercator series. $T_c$ is a change in time, $\Delta t$. Then we have

$$r \approx \frac{\Delta N}{\Delta t} \frac{1}{N_0}$$,

which is the discrete definition of the intrinsic rate of increase.

== Growth models ==
In general, population growth roughly follows one of these trends:

- Logistic growth leveling out at some carrying capacity.
- Overshoot ("boom" and "bust" cycles).
- Oscillation at or below the carrying capacity.

Insect pest growth rates are heavily influenced by temperature and rainfall, among other variables. Sometimes pest populations grow rapidly and become outbreaks.

=== Degree-day calculations ===
Because insects are ectothermic, "temperature is probably the single most important environmental factor influencing insect behavior, distribution, development, survival, and reproduction." As a result, growing degree-days are commonly used to estimate insect development, often relative to a biofix point, i.e., a biological milestone, such as when the insect comes out of pupation in spring. Degree-days can help with pest control.

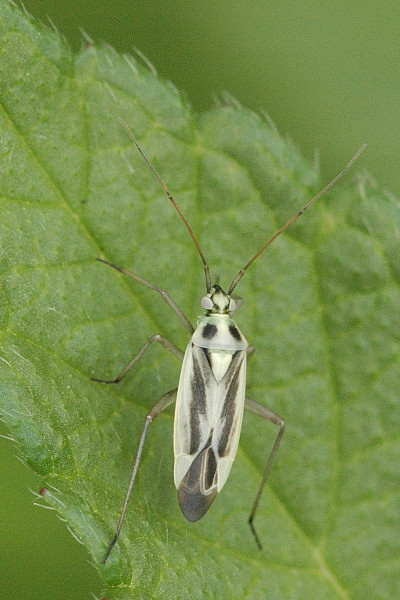
Stenotus binotatus, a plant bug in the group Heteroptera

Yamamura and Kiritani approximated the development rate $r$ as

$$r = \begin{cases} \frac{T-T_0}{K}, & T \geq T_0 \\ 0, & T < T_0 \end{cases}$$,

with $T$ being the current temperature, $T_0$ being the base temperature for the species, and $K$ being a thermal constant for the species. A generation is defined as the duration required for the time-integral of $r$ to equal 1. Using linear approximations, the authors estimate that if the temperature increased by $\Delta T$ (for instance, maybe $\Delta T$ = 2 °C for climate change by 2100 relative to 1990), then the increase in number of generations per year $\Delta N$ would be

$$\Delta N \approx \frac{\Delta T}{K} \left(206.7 + 12.46 (m-T_0) \right)$$,

where $m$ is the current annual mean temperature of a location. In particular, the authors suggest that 2 °C warming might lead to, for example, about one extra generation for Lepidoptera, Hemiptera, two extra generations for Diptera, almost three generations for Hymenoptera, and almost five generations for Aphidoidea. These changes in voltinism might happen through biological dispersal and/or natural selection; the authors point to prior examples of each in Japan.

=== Geometric Brownian motion ===
Sunding and Zivin model population growth of insect pests as a geometric Brownian motion (GBM) process. The model is stochastic in order to account for the variability of growth rates as a function of external conditions like weather. In particular, if $X$ is the current insect population, $\alpha$ is the intrinsic growth rate, and $\sigma$ is a variance coefficient, the authors assume that

$$dX = \alpha X dt + \sigma X dz$$,

where $dt$ is an increment of time, and $dz = \xi_t \sqrt{dt}$ is an increment of a Wiener process, with $\xi_t$ being standard-normal distributed. In this model, short-run population changes are dominated by the stochastic term, $\sigma X dz$, but long-run changes are dominated by the trend term, $\alpha X dt$.

After solving this equation, we find that the population at time $t$, $X_t$, is log-normally distributed:

$$X_t \sim \operatorname{Log-\mathcal{N}}\left(X_0 e^{\alpha t}, X_0^2 e^{2 \alpha t} (e^{\sigma^2 t} - 1)\right)$$,

where $X_0$ is the initial population.

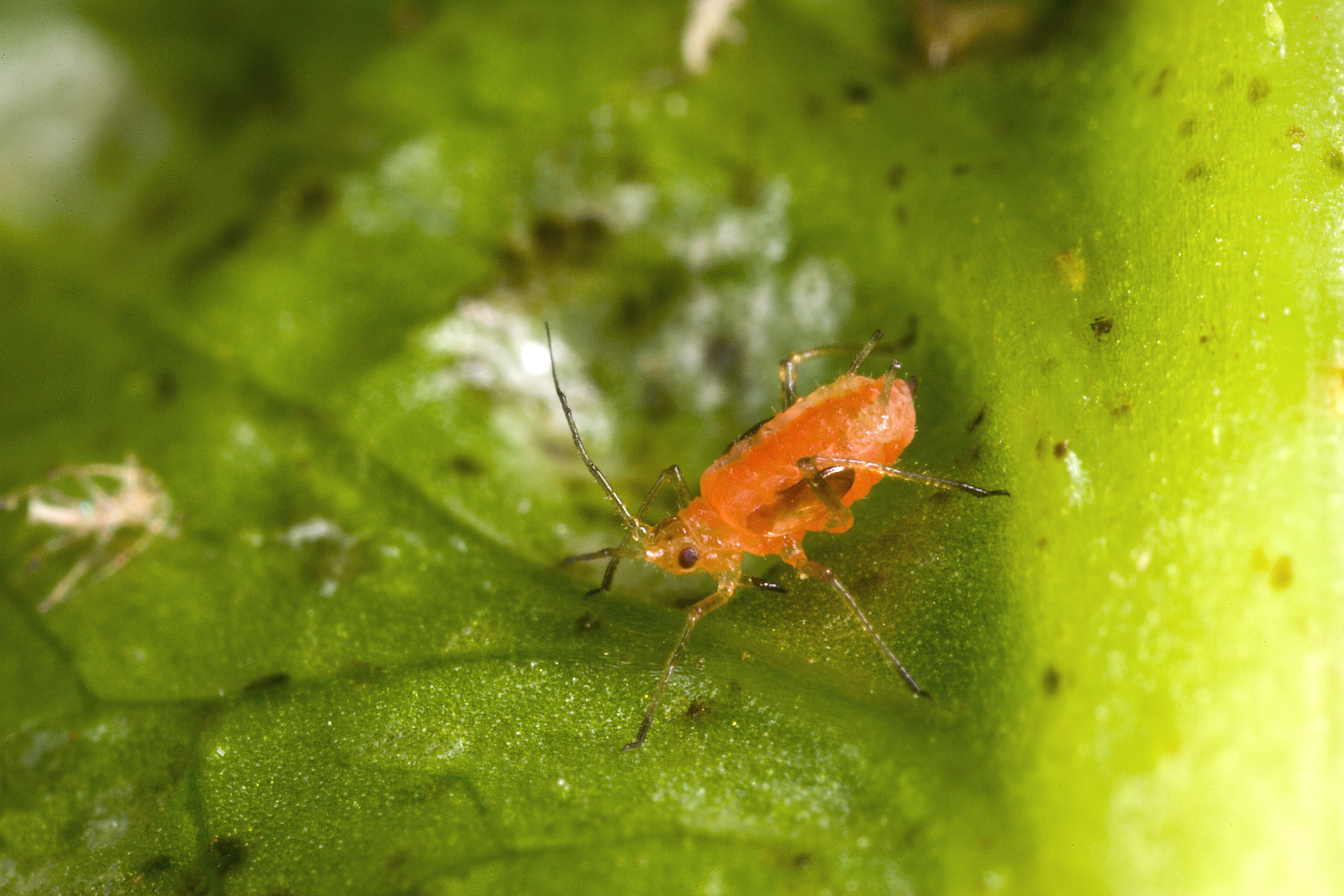
Lettuce aphid

As a case study, the authors consider mevinphos application on leaf lettuce in Salinas Valley, California, for the purpose of controlling aphids. Previous research by other authors found that daily percentage growth of the green peach aphid could be modeled as an increasing linear function of average daily temperature. Combined with the fact that temperature is normally distributed, this agreed with the GBM equations described above, and the authors derived that $\alpha = 0.1199$ and $\sigma = 0.1152$. Since the expected population based on the log-normal distribution grows with $e^{\alpha t}$, this implies an aphid doubling time of $\ln 2 / 0.1199 = 5.8$ days. Note that other literature has found aphid generation times to lie roughly in the range of 4.7 to 5.8 days.

=== Repeated outbreak cycles ===
A 2013 study analyzed population dynamics of the smaller tea tortrix, a moth pest that infests tea plantations, especially in Japan. The data consisted of counts of adult moths captured with light traps every 5–6 days at the Kagoshima tea station in Japan from 1961 to 2012. Peak populations were 100 to 4000 times higher than at their lowest levels. A wavelet decomposition showed a clear, relatively stationary annual cycle in the populations, as well as non-stationary punctuations between late April and early October, representing 4–6 outbreaks per year of this multivoltine species. The cycles result from population overshoot.

These moths have stage-structured development life cycles, and a traditional hypothesis suggests that these cycles should be most synchronized across the population in the spring due to the preceding effects of cold winter months, and as the summer progresses, the life stages become more randomly assorted. This is often what's observed in North America. However, this study observed instead that populations were more correlated as the season progressed, perhaps because temperature fluctuations enforced synchrony. The authors found that when temperatures first increased above about 15 °C (59 °F) in the spring, the population dynamics crossed a Hopf bifurcation from stability to repeated outbreak cycles, until stabilization again in the fall. Above the Hopf threshold, population-cycle amplitude increased roughly linearly with temperature. This study affirmed the classic concept of temperature as a "pacemaker of all vital rates."

Understanding life-cycle dynamics is relevant for pest control because some insecticides only work at one or two life stages of the insect.

== Effects of pest control ==
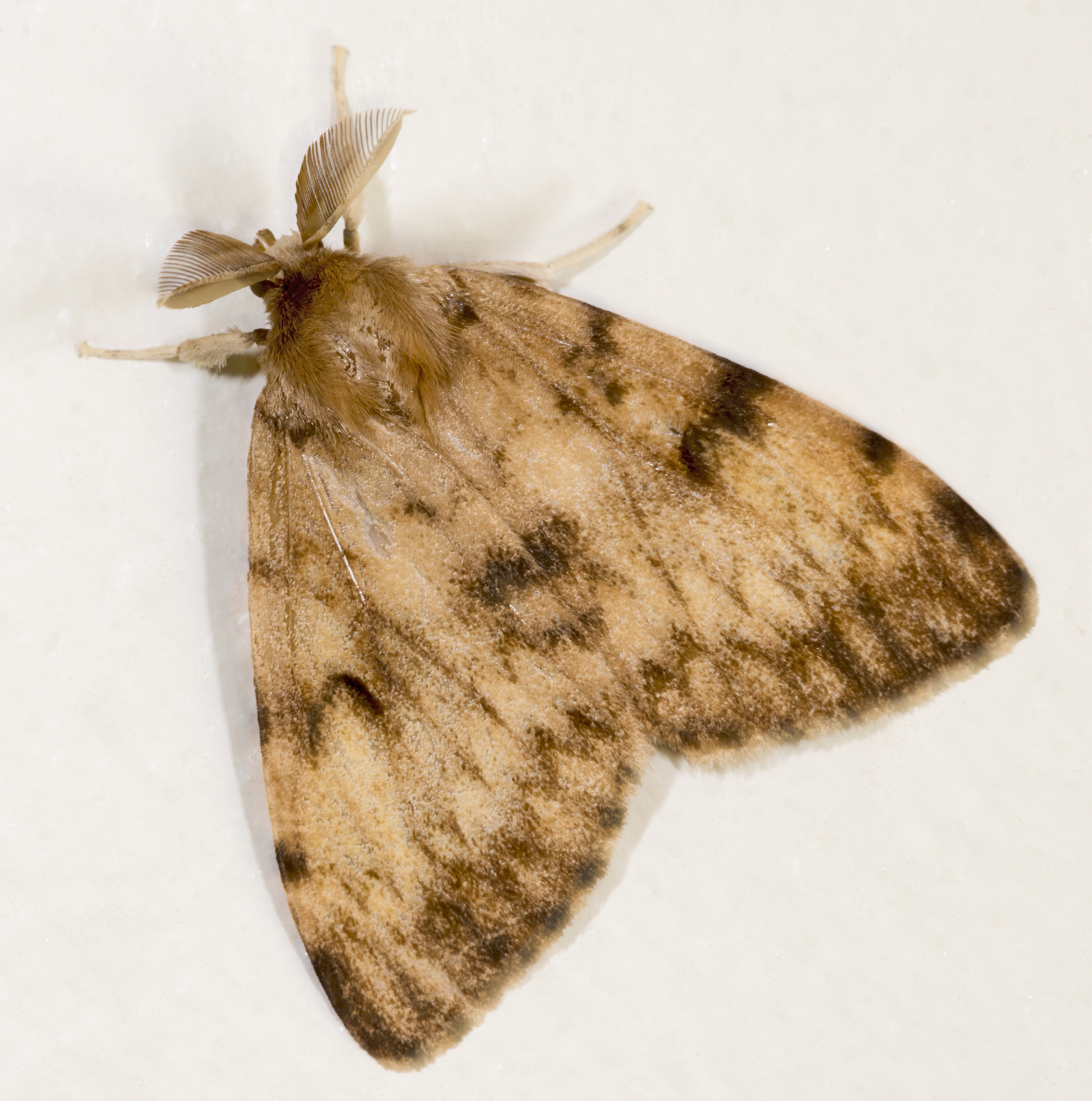
Adult male gypsy moth

B. Chaney, a farm advisor in Monterey County, CA, estimates that mevinphos would kill practically all aphids in a field upon application. Wyatt, citing data from various Arthropod Management Tests, estimates that the percent of lettuce aphids killed is 76.1% for endosulfan and 67.0% for imidacloprid.

Insecticides used on gypsy moths in the 1970s had roughly a 90% kill rate.

== Impact of climate change ==
Temperature change is argued to be the biggest direct abiotic impact of climate change on herbivorous insects. In temperate regions, global warming will affect overwintering, and warmer temperatures will extend the summer season, allowing for more growth and reproduction.

A 2013 study estimated that on average, crop pests and pathogens have moved to higher latitudes at a rate of about 2.7 km/year since 1960. This is roughly in line with estimates of the rate of climate change in general.

== See also ==
- Insect ecology
- Population ecology
- Pesticide resistance
- Insecticide
- Pest control
