= Adoxophyes afonini =

Scientific classification
- Domain: Eukaryota
- Kingdom: Animalia
- Phylum: Arthropoda
- Class: Insecta
- Order: Lepidoptera
- Family: Tortricidae
- Genus: Adoxophyes
- Species: A. afonini

Binomial name
- Adoxophyes afonini Razowski, 2009

Species of moth

Adoxophyes afonini is a moth of the family Tortricidae which is endemic to Vietnam.
