= Adoxophyes congruana =

Scientific classification
- Kingdom: Animalia
- Phylum: Arthropoda
- Class: Insecta
- Order: Lepidoptera
- Family: Tortricidae
- Genus: Adoxophyes
- Species: A. congruana

Binomial name
- Adoxophyes congruana (Walker, 1863)

Synonyms
- Dichelia congruana Walker, 1863; Tortrix shanghaiana Walker, 1863

Species of moth

Adoxophyes congruana is a species of moth of the family Tortricidae. It is found in China.
