= Adoxophyes meion =

Scientific classification
- Kingdom: Animalia
- Phylum: Arthropoda
- Class: Insecta
- Order: Lepidoptera
- Family: Tortricidae
- Genus: Adoxophyes
- Species: A. meion

Binomial name
- Adoxophyes meion Razowski, 2013

Species of moth

Adoxophyes meion is a species of moth of the family Tortricidae first described by Józef Razowski in 2013. It is found on Seram Island in Indonesia. The habitat consists of secondary forests and dipterocarp forests.

The wingspan is about 14 mm.
