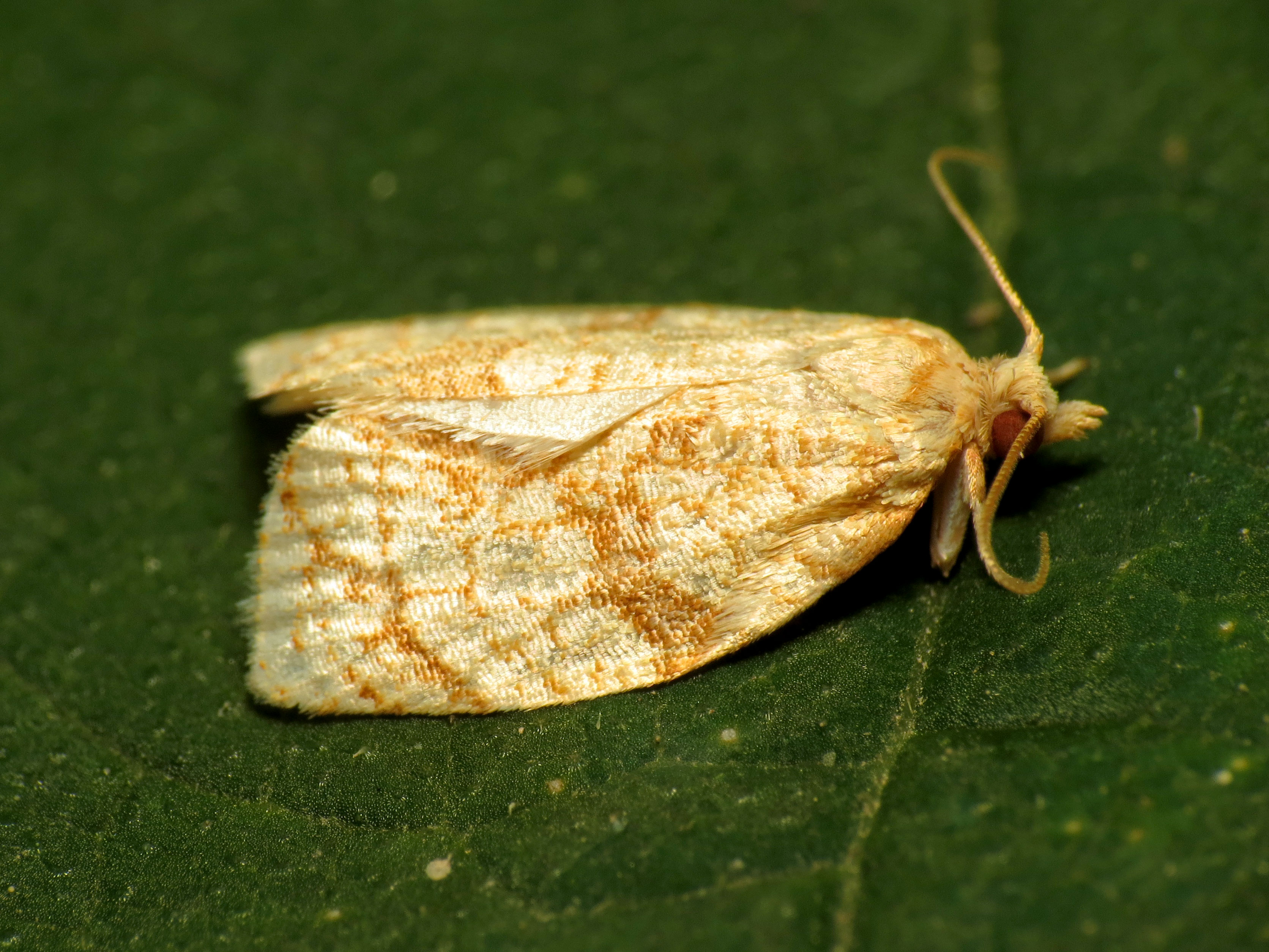

Scientific classification
- Domain: Eukaryota
- Kingdom: Animalia
- Phylum: Arthropoda
- Class: Insecta
- Order: Lepidoptera
- Family: Tortricidae
- Genus: Adoxophyes
- Species: A. negundana

Binomial name
- Adoxophyes negundana (McDunnough, 1923)

Synonyms
- Homona negundana McDunnough, 1923

= Adoxophyes negundana =

Species of moth

Adoxophyes negundana, the shimmering adoxophyes moth, is a species of moth of the family Tortricidae. It is found in North America, where it has been recorded from Ontario to Manitoba, south to Florida and west to Utah.

The length of the forewings is 7.5–9.5 mm. Adults are on wing in June to early September.

The larvae feed on Acer negundo. They roll the leaves of their host plant.
