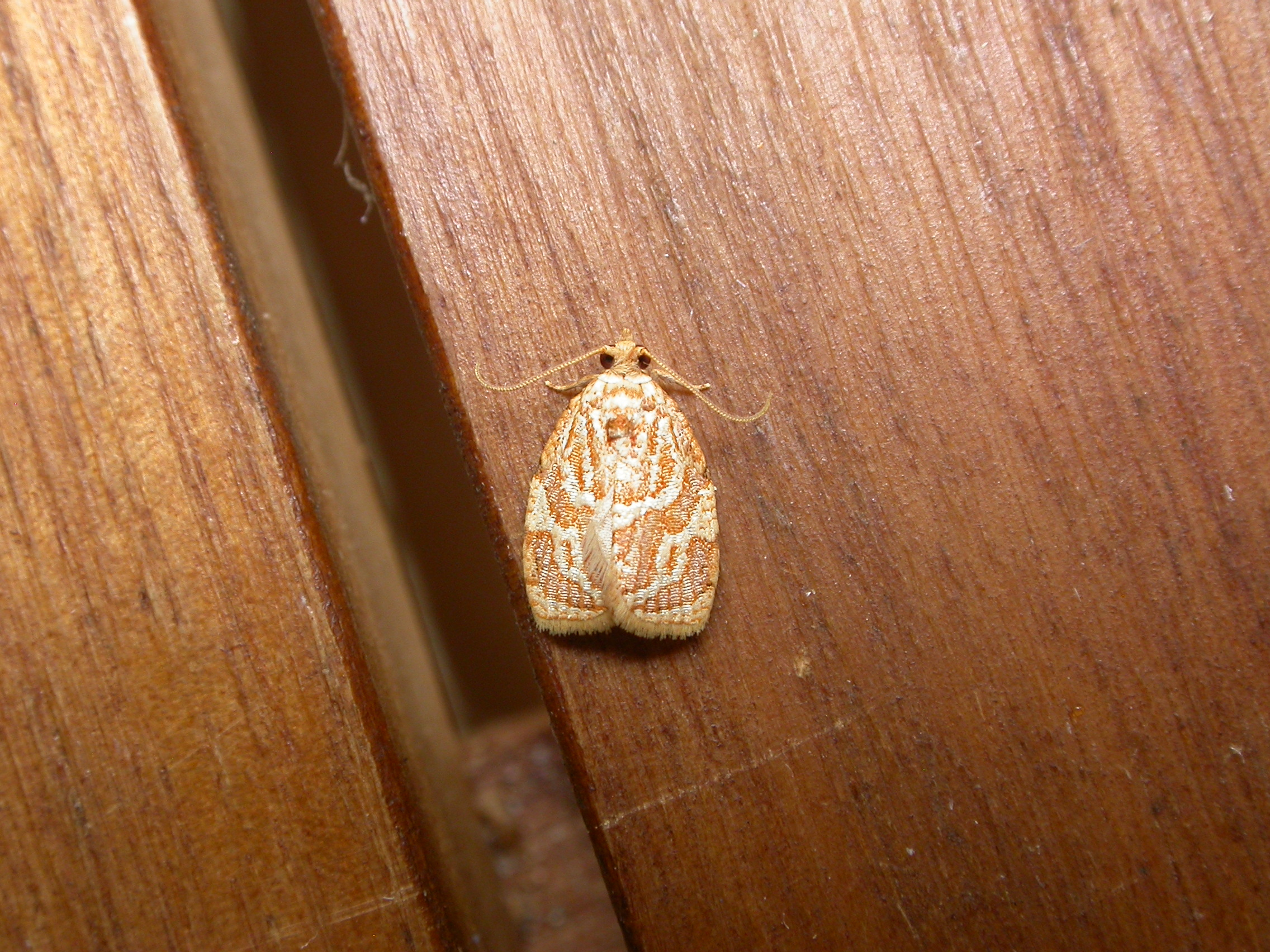

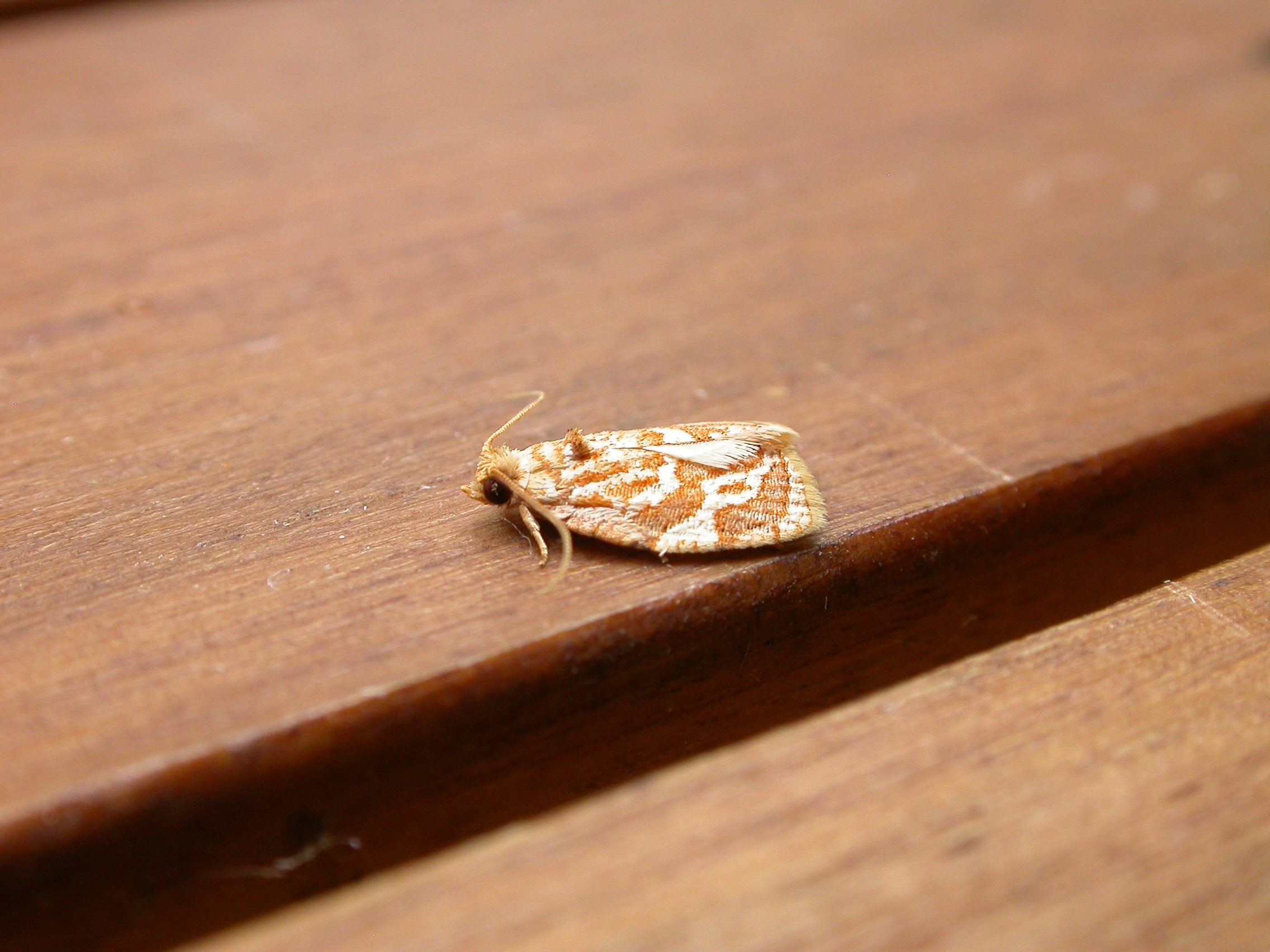

Scientific classification
- Domain: Eukaryota
- Kingdom: Animalia
- Phylum: Arthropoda
- Class: Insecta
- Order: Lepidoptera
- Family: Tortricidae
- Genus: Adoxophyes
- Species: A. templana

Binomial name
- Adoxophyes templana (Pagenstecher, 1900)

Synonyms
- Tortrix templana Pagenstecher, 1900; Adoxophyes ioterma Meyrick, 1910; Adoxophyes thelcteropa Turner, 1945

= Adoxophyes templana =

Species of moth

Adoxophyes templana is a species of moth of the family Tortricidae. It is found in Australia (the Northern Territory and Queensland), but also on the Bismarck Archipelago.

The wingspan is about 15 mm.

The larvae feed on Citrus, Rhizophora stylosa, Aegiceras corniculatum, Excoecaria agallocha, Melaleuca dealbata and Melaleuca quinquenervia.
