= Adoxophyes libralis =

Scientific classification
- Kingdom: Animalia
- Phylum: Arthropoda
- Class: Insecta
- Order: Lepidoptera
- Family: Tortricidae
- Genus: Adoxophyes
- Species: A. libralis

Binomial name
- Adoxophyes libralis Meyrick, 1927

Species of moth

Adoxophyes libralis is a species of moth of the family Tortricidae. It is found on Samoa in the South Pacific.
