= Adoxophyes peritoma =

Scientific classification
- Kingdom: Animalia
- Phylum: Arthropoda
- Class: Insecta
- Order: Lepidoptera
- Family: Tortricidae
- Genus: Adoxophyes
- Species: A. peritoma

Binomial name
- Adoxophyes peritoma Meyrick, 1918

Species of moth

Adoxophyes peritoma is a species of moth of the family Tortricidae. It is found in Madagascar.
