= Adoxophyes furcatana =

Scientific classification
- Kingdom: Animalia
- Phylum: Arthropoda
- Class: Insecta
- Order: Lepidoptera
- Family: Tortricidae
- Genus: Adoxophyes
- Species: A. furcatana

Binomial name
- Adoxophyes furcatana (Walker, 1863)

Synonyms
- Dichelia furcatana Walker, 1863

Species of moth

Adoxophyes furcatana is a species of moth of the family Tortricidae. It is found in eastern North America.

The length of the forewings is 7.5–10.5 mm. Adults are on wing in June and August.

The larvae feed on Platanus species. They roll the leaves of their host plant.
