= Adoxophyes instillata =

Scientific classification
- Kingdom: Animalia
- Phylum: Arthropoda
- Class: Insecta
- Order: Lepidoptera
- Family: Tortricidae
- Genus: Adoxophyes
- Species: A. instillata

Binomial name
- Adoxophyes instillata Meyrick, 1922

Species of moth

Adoxophyes instillata is a species of moth of the family Tortricidae. It is found in Australia, where it has been recorded from Queensland.
