= Adoxophyes luctuosa =

Scientific classification
- Kingdom: Animalia
- Phylum: Arthropoda
- Class: Insecta
- Order: Lepidoptera
- Family: Tortricidae
- Genus: Adoxophyes
- Species: A. luctuosa

Binomial name
- Adoxophyes luctuosa Razowski, 2013

Species of moth

Adoxophyes luctuosa is a species of moth in the family Tortricidae, first described by Józef Razowski in 2013. It is found on Seram Island in Indonesia. Its habitat consists of lower montane forests, and its wingspan is approximately 20 mm..
