= Adoxophyes heteroidana =

Scientific classification
- Kingdom: Animalia
- Phylum: Arthropoda
- Class: Insecta
- Order: Lepidoptera
- Family: Tortricidae
- Genus: Adoxophyes
- Species: A. heteroidana

Binomial name
- Adoxophyes heteroidana Meyrick, 1881

Synonyms
- Adoxophyes ablepta Turner, 1945; Adoxophyes amblychroa Turner, 1945

Species of moth

Adoxophyes heteroidana is a species of moth of the family Tortricidae. It is found in Australia, where it has been recorded from Queensland.
