= Population dynamics =

Mathematics of change in size and age

Population dynamics is the type of mathematics used to model and study the size and age composition of populations as dynamical systems. Population dynamics is a branch of mathematical biology, and uses mathematical techniques such as differential equations to model behaviour. Population dynamics is also closely related to other mathematical biology fields such as epidemiology, and also uses techniques from evolutionary game theory in its modelling.

== History ==
Population dynamics has traditionally been the dominant branch of mathematical biology, which has a history of more than 220 years, although over the last century the scope of mathematical biology has greatly expanded.

The beginning of population dynamics is widely regarded as the work of Malthus, formulated as the Malthusian growth model. According to Malthus, assuming that the conditions (the environment) remain constant (ceteris paribus), a population will grow (or decline) exponentially. This principle provided the basis for the subsequent predictive theories, such as the demographic studies such as the work of Benjamin Gompertz and Pierre François Verhulst in the early 19th century, who refined and adjusted the Malthusian demographic model.

A more general model formulation was proposed by F. J. Richards in 1959, further expanded by Simon Hopkins, in which the models of Gompertz, Verhulst and also Ludwig von Bertalanffy are covered as special cases of the general formulation. The Lotka–Volterra predator-prey equations are another famous example, as well as the alternative Arditi–Ginzburg equations.

== Logistic function ==
Simplified population models usually start with four key variables (four demographic processes) including death, birth, immigration, and emigration. Mathematical models used to calculate changes in population demographics and evolution hold the assumption of no external influence. Models can be more mathematically complex where "...several competing hypotheses are simultaneously confronted with the data." For example, in a closed system where immigration and emigration does not take place, the rate of change in the number of individuals in a population can be described as:
$${\mathrm{d}N\over\mathrm{d}t} = B - D = bN - dN = (b - d)N = rN,$$
where N is the total number of individuals in the specific experimental population being studied, B is the number of births and D is the number of deaths per individual in a particular experiment or model. The algebraic symbols b, d and r stand for the rates of birth, death, and the rate of change per individual in the general population, the intrinsic rate of increase. This formula can be read as the rate of change in the population (dN/dt) is equal to births minus deaths (B − D).

Using these techniques, Malthus' population principle of growth was later transformed into a mathematical model known as the logistic equation:
$${\mathrm{d}N\over\mathrm{d}t} = rN \left(1 - {N\over K}\right),$$
where N is the population size, r is the intrinsic rate of natural increase, and K is the carrying capacity of the population. The formula can be read as follows: the rate of change in the population (dN/dt) is equal to growth (rN) that is limited by carrying capacity (1 − N/K). From these basic mathematical principles the discipline of population ecology expands into a field of investigation that queries the demographics of real populations and tests these results against the statistical models. The field of population ecology often uses data on life history and matrix algebra to develop projection matrices on fecundity and survivorship. This information is used for managing wildlife stocks and setting harvest quotas.

== Intrinsic rate of increase ==
The rate at which a population increases in size if there are no density-dependent forces regulating the population is known as the intrinsic rate of increase. It is
$${\mathrm{d}N\over\mathrm{d}t} = r N$$
where the derivative $dN/dt$ is the rate of increase of the population, N is the population size, and r is the intrinsic rate of increase. Thus r is the maximum theoretical rate of increase of a population per individual – that is, the maximum population growth rate. The concept is commonly used in insect population ecology or management to determine how environmental factors affect the rate at which pest populations increase. See also exponential population growth and logistic population growth.

== Epidemiology ==
Population dynamics overlap with another active area of research in mathematical biology: mathematical epidemiology, the study of infectious disease affecting populations. Various models of viral spread have been proposed and analysed, and provide important results that may be applied to health policy decisions.

== Geometric populations ==
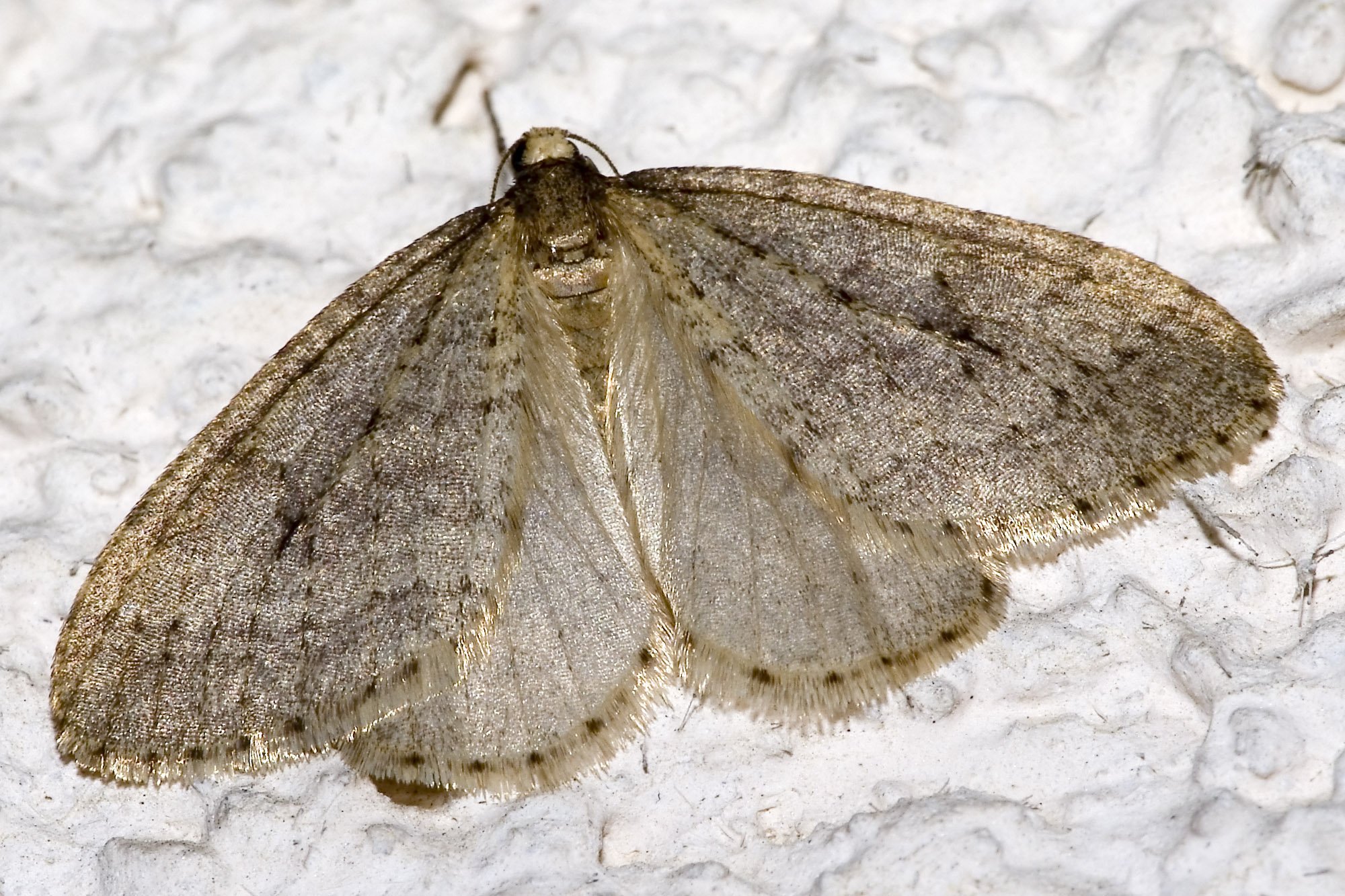
Operophtera brumata populations are geometric.

The mathematical formula below is used to model geometric populations. Such populations grow in discrete reproductive periods between intervals of abstinence, as opposed to populations which grow without designated periods for reproduction. Say that the natural number t is the index the generation (t=0 for the first generation, t=1 for the second generation, etc.). The letter t is used because the index of a generation is time. Say N_{t} denotes, at generation t, the number of individuals of the population that will reproduce, i.e. the population size at generation t. The population at the next generation, which is the population at time t+1 is:
$$N_{t+1} = N_t + B_t - D_t + I_t - E_t$$
where

- B_{t} is the number of births in the population between generations t and t + 1,
- D_{t} is the number of deaths between generations t and t + 1,
- I_{t} is the number of immigrants added to the population between generations t and t + 1, and
- E_{t} is the number of emigrants moving out of the population between generations t and t + 1.

For the sake of simplicity, we suppose there is no migration to or from the population, but the following method can be applied without this assumption. Mathematically, it means that for all t, I_{t} = E_{t} = 0. The previous equation becomes:
$$N_{t+1} = N_t + B_t - D_t.$$

In general, the number of births and the number of deaths are approximately proportional to the population size. This remark motivates the following definitions.

- The birth rate at time t is defined by b_{t} = B_{t} / N_{t}.
- The death rate at time t is defined by d_{t} = D_{t} / N_{t}.

The previous equation can then be rewritten as:
$$N_{t+1} = (1 + b_t - d_t)N_t.$$

Then, we assume the birth and death rates do not depend on the time t (which is equivalent to assume that the number of births and deaths are effectively proportional to the population size). This is the core assumption for geometric populations, because with it we are going to obtain a geometric sequence. Then we define the geometric rate of increase R = b_{t} - d_{t} to be the birth rate minus the death rate. The geometric rate of increase do not depend on time t, because both the birth rate minus the death rate do not, with our assumption. We obtain:
$$\begin{align}
N_{t+1} &= \left(1 + R\right) N_t.
\end{align}$$
This equation means that the sequence (N_{t}) is geometric with first term N_{0} and common ratio 1 + R, which we define to be λ. λ is also called the finite rate of increase.

Therefore, by induction, we obtain the expression of the population size at time t:
$$N_t = \lambda^t N_0$$
where λ^{t} is the finite rate of increase raised to the power of the number of generations. This last expression is more convenient than the previous one, because it is explicit. For example, say one wants to calculate with a calculator N_{10}, the population at the tenth generation, knowing N_{0} the initial population and λ the finite rate of increase. With the last formula, the result is immediate by plugging t = 10, whether with the previous one it is necessary to know N_{9}, N_{8}, ..., N_{2} until N_{1}.

We can identify three cases:

- If λ > 1, i.e. if R > 0, i.e. (with the assumption that both birth and death rate do not depend on time t) if b_{0} > d_{0}, i.e. if the birth rate is strictly greater than the death rate, then the population size is increasing and tends to infinity. Of course, in real life, a population cannot grow indefinitely: at some point the population lacks resources and so the death rate increases, which invalidates our core assumption because the death rate now depends on time.
- If λ < 1, i.e. if R < 0, i.e. (with the assumption that both birth and death rate do not depend on time t) if b_{0} < d_{0}, i.e. if the birth rate is strictly smaller than the death rate, then the population size is decreasing and tends to 0.
- If λ = 1, i.e. if R = 0, i.e. (with the assumption that both birth and death rate do not depend on time t) if b_{0} = d_{0}, i.e. if the birth rate is equal to the death rate, then the population size is constant, equal to the initial population N_{0}.

=== Doubling time ===
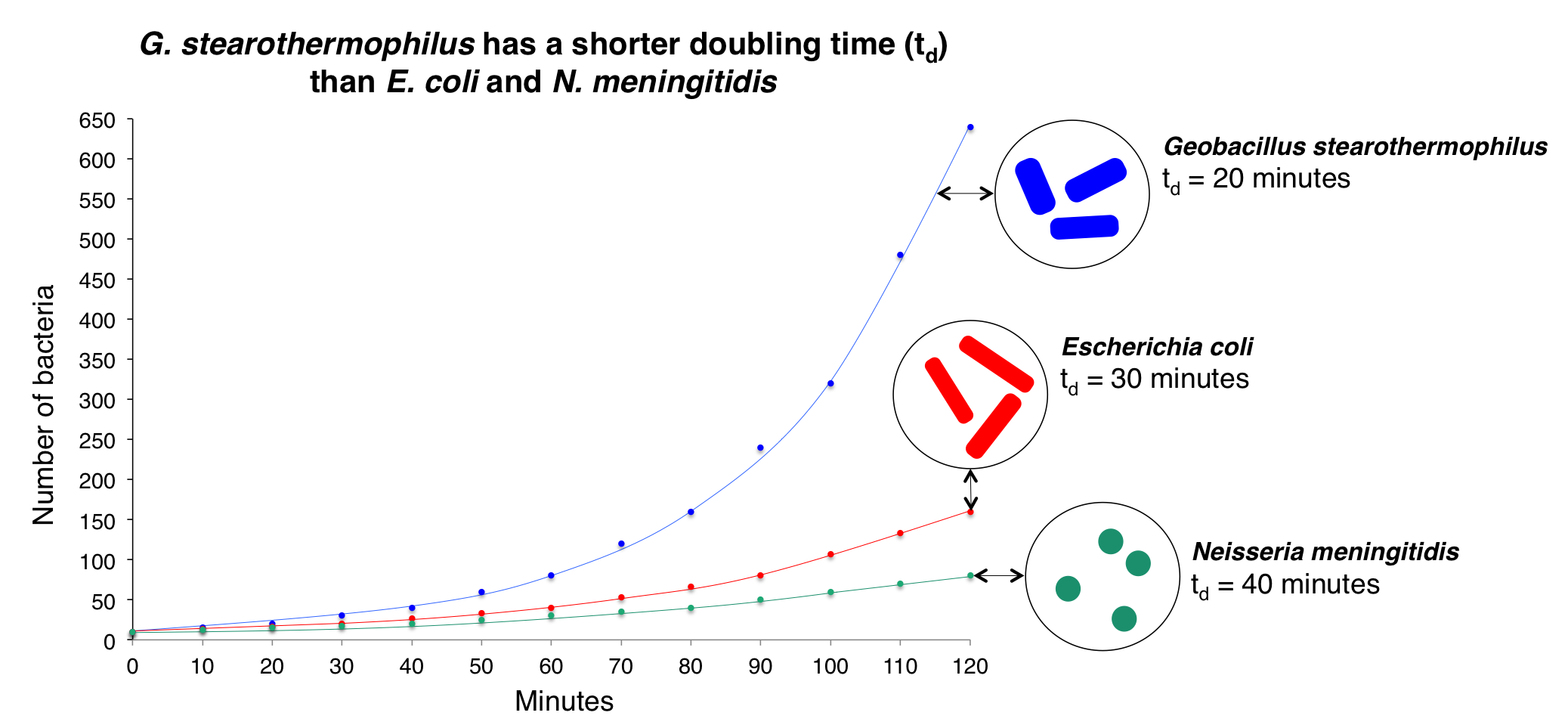
G. stearothermophilus has a shorter doubling time (td) than E. coli and N. meningitidis. Growth rates of 2 bacterial species will differ by unexpected orders of magnitude if the doubling times of the 2 species differ by even as little as 10 minutes. In eukaryotes such as animals, fungi, plants, and protists, doubling times are much longer than in bacteria. This reduces the growth rates of eukaryotes in comparison to Bacteria. G. stearothermophilus, E. coli, and N. meningitidis have 20 minute, 30 minute, and 40 minute doubling times under optimal conditions respectively. If bacterial populations could grow indefinitely (which they do not) then the number of bacteria in each species would approach infinity (∞). However, the percentage of G. stearothermophilus bacteria out of all the bacteria would approach 100% whilst the percentage of E. coli and N. meningitidis combined out of all the bacteria would approach 0%. This graph is a simulation of this hypothetical scenario. In reality, bacterial populations do not grow indefinitely in size and the 3 species require different optimal conditions to bring their doubling times to minima.: Time in minutes / % that is G. stearothermophilus; 30 / 44.4%; 60 / 53.3%; 90 / 64.9%; 120 / 72.7%; →∞ / 100%; Time in minutes / % that is E. coli; 30 / 29.6%; 60 / 26.7%; 90 / 21.6%; 120 / 18.2%; →∞ / 0.00%; Time in minutes / % that is N. meningitidis; 30 / 25.9%; 60 / 20.0%; 90 / 13.5%; 120 / 9.10%; →∞ / 0.00%; Disclaimer: Bacterial populations are logistic instead of geometric. Nevertheless, doubling times are applicable to both types of populations.

The doubling time (t_{d}) of a population is the time required for the population to grow to twice its size. We can calculate the doubling time of a geometric population using the equation: N_{t} = λ^{t} N_{0} by exploiting our knowledge of the fact that the population (N) is twice its size (2N) after the doubling time.

$$\begin{align}
N_{t_d} &= \lambda^{t_d} N_0 \\
2 N_0 &= \lambda^{t_d} N_0 \\
\lambda^{t_d} &= 2
\end{align}$$

The doubling time can be found by taking logarithms. For instance:
$$t_d \log_2(\lambda) = \log_2(2) = 1
\implies t_d = {1\over\log_2(\lambda)}$$
Or:
$$t_d \ln(\lambda) = \ln(2)
\implies t_d = {\ln(2)\over\ln(\lambda)}$$

Therefore:
$$t_d = \frac{1}{\log_2(\lambda)} = \frac{0.693...}{\ln(\lambda)}$$

=== Half-life of geometric populations ===
The half-life of a population is the time taken for the population to decline to half its size. We can calculate the half-life of a geometric population using the equation: N_{t} = λ^{t} N_{0} by exploiting our knowledge of the fact that the population (N) is half its size (0.5N) after a half-life.

$$N_{t_{1/2}} = \lambda^{t_{1/2}} N_0
\implies \frac{1}{2} N_0 = \lambda^{t_{1/2}} N_0
\implies \lambda^{t_{1/2}} = \frac{1}{2}$$
where t_{1/2} is the half-life.

The half-life can be calculated by taking logarithms (see above).
$$t_{1/2} = {1\over\log_{0.5}(\lambda)} = -{\ln(2)\over\ln(\lambda)}$$

Note that as the population is assumed to decline, λ < 1, so ln(λ) < 0.

=== Mathematical relationship between geometric and logistic populations ===
In geometric populations, R and λ represent growth constants (see 2 and 2.3). In logistic populations however, the intrinsic growth rate, also known as intrinsic rate of increase (r) is the relevant growth constant. Since generations of reproduction in a geometric population do not overlap (e.g. reproduce once a year) but do in an exponential population, geometric and exponential populations are usually considered to be mutually exclusive. However, both sets of constants share the mathematical relationship below.

The growth equation for exponential populations is
$$N_t = N_0 e^{rt}$$
where e is Euler's number, a universal constant often applicable in logistic equations, and r is the intrinsic growth rate.

To find the relationship between a geometric population and a logistic population, we assume the N_{t} is the same for both models, and we expand to the following equality:
$$\begin{align}
N_0 e^{rt} &= N_0 \lambda^t \\
e^{rt} &= \lambda^t \\
rt &= t \ln(\lambda)
\end{align}$$
Giving us
$$r = \ln(\lambda)$$
and
$$\lambda = e^r.$$

== Evolutionary game theory ==
Evolutionary game theory was first developed by Ronald Fisher in his 1930 article The Genetic Theory of Natural Selection. In 1973 John Maynard Smith formalised a central concept, the evolutionarily stable strategy.

Population dynamics have been used in several control theory applications. Evolutionary game theory can be used in different industrial or other contexts. Industrially, it is mostly used in multiple-input-multiple-output (MIMO) systems, although it can be adapted for use in single-input-single-output (SISO) systems. Some other examples of applications are military campaigns, water distribution, dispatch of distributed generators, lab experiments, transport problems, communication problems, among others.

== Oscillatory ==
Population size in plants experiences significant oscillation due to the annual environmental oscillation. Plant dynamics experience a higher degree of this seasonality than do mammals, birds, or bivoltine insects. When combined with perturbations due to disease, this often results in chaotic oscillations.

== In popular culture ==
The computer game SimCity, Sim Earth and the MMORPG Ultima Online, among others, tried to simulate some of these population dynamics.

== See also ==
- Delayed density dependence
- Lotka-Volterra equations
- Minimum viable population
- Maximum sustainable yield
- Nicholson–Bailey model
- Pest insect population dynamics
- Population cycle
- Population dynamics of fisheries
- Population ecology
- Population genetics
- Population modeling
- Ricker model
- r/K selection theory
- System dynamics
- Random generalized Lotka–Volterra model
- Consumer-resource model
