= Adoxophyes dubia =

Scientific classification
- Kingdom: Animalia
- Phylum: Arthropoda
- Clade: Pancrustacea
- Class: Insecta
- Order: Lepidoptera
- Family: Tortricidae
- Genus: Adoxophyes
- Species: A. dubia

Binomial name
- Adoxophyes dubia Yasuda, 1998

Species of moth

Adoxophyes dubia is a species of moth of the family Tortricidae. It is found in Japan, where it has been recorded from southern Honshu, Shikoku, Kyushu and Okinawa.

The length of the forewings is 8 mm for males and 9 mm for females.

The larvae feed on Lyonia and Ribes species.
