= Adoxophyes tripselia =

Scientific classification
- Domain: Eukaryota
- Kingdom: Animalia
- Phylum: Arthropoda
- Class: Insecta
- Order: Lepidoptera
- Family: Tortricidae
- Genus: Adoxophyes
- Species: A. tripselia

Binomial name
- Adoxophyes tripselia (Lower, 1908)

Synonyms
- Capua tripselia Lower, 1908

Species of moth

Adoxophyes tripselia is a species of moth of the family Tortricidae. It is found in Australia, where it has been recorded from Queensland.

The wingspan is 12–16 mm for males and 16–20 mm for females. The ground colour of the forewings is whitish. The markings are edged with dark fuscous, partially filled with variable fuscous suffusion, and more or less marked with brownish-ochreous on the veins. The hindwings are white.
