= Adoxophyes cyrtosema =

Scientific classification
- Kingdom: Animalia
- Phylum: Arthropoda
- Class: Insecta
- Order: Lepidoptera
- Family: Tortricidae
- Genus: Adoxophyes
- Species: A. cyrtosema

Binomial name
- Adoxophyes cyrtosema Meyrick, 1886

Synonyms
- Adoxophyes novohebridensis Diakonoff, 1961

Species of moth

Adoxophyes cyrtosema is a species of moth of the family Tortricidae. It is found in Tonga, on the New Hebrides and in China (Guangzhou, Fujian).

The larvae have been recorded feeding on litchi and longan.
