= Adoxophyes melichroa =

Scientific classification
- Domain: Eukaryota
- Kingdom: Animalia
- Phylum: Arthropoda
- Class: Insecta
- Order: Lepidoptera
- Family: Tortricidae
- Genus: Adoxophyes
- Species: A. melichroa

Binomial name
- Adoxophyes melichroa (Lower, 1899)

Synonyms
- Capua melichroa Lower, 1899; Tortrix rufostriatana Pagenstecher, 1900

Species of moth

Adoxophyes melichroa is a species of moth of the family Tortricidae first described by Oswald Bertram Lower in 1899. It is found in Australia (Queensland) and New Guinea.

The wingspan is 15–16 mm for males and 18–21 mm for females. The basal patch on the forewings is sometimes marked with several dark ferruginous-fuscous strigulae (fine streaks) towards the dorsum. The central fascia are narrow and dark purplish fuscous mixed with ferruginous. The hindwings are whitish yellowish. Adults have been recorded on wing from September to December and in April.
