= Adoxophyes beijingensis =

Scientific classification
- Domain: Eukaryota
- Kingdom: Animalia
- Phylum: Arthropoda
- Class: Insecta
- Order: Lepidoptera
- Family: Tortricidae
- Genus: Adoxophyes
- Species: A. beijingensis

Binomial name
- Adoxophyes beijingensis Zhou, Qui & Fu, 1997

Synonyms
- Adoxophyes orana beijingensis Zhou, Qui & Fu, 1997

Species of moth

Adoxophyes beijingensis is a species of moth of the family Tortricidae. It is found in China (Liaoning, Hebei, Shandong) and Japan.

There are three generations per year in Liaoning. . After hibernation, larvae start feeding in May. Adults have been recorded on wing from mid-June to late June, from late June to early August and from early September to mid-September.

The larvae feed on Malus pumila and Prunus persica.
