= Adoxophyes nebrodes =

Scientific classification
- Kingdom: Animalia
- Phylum: Arthropoda
- Class: Insecta
- Order: Lepidoptera
- Family: Tortricidae
- Genus: Adoxophyes
- Species: A. nebrodes

Binomial name
- Adoxophyes nebrodes Meyrick, 1920

Species of moth

Adoxophyes nebrodes is a species of moth of the family Tortricidae. It is found in New Guinea.
