= Adoxophyes thoracica =

Scientific classification
- Domain: Eukaryota
- Kingdom: Animalia
- Phylum: Arthropoda
- Class: Insecta
- Order: Lepidoptera
- Family: Tortricidae
- Genus: Adoxophyes
- Species: A. thoracica

Binomial name
- Adoxophyes thoracica Diakonoff, 1941

Species of moth

Adoxophyes thoracica is a species of moth of the family Tortricidae. It is found in New Guinea.
