= Adoxophyes balioleuca =

Scientific classification
- Domain: Eukaryota
- Kingdom: Animalia
- Phylum: Arthropoda
- Class: Insecta
- Order: Lepidoptera
- Family: Tortricidae
- Genus: Adoxophyes
- Species: A. balioleuca

Binomial name
- Adoxophyes balioleuca Clarke, 1976

Species of moth

Adoxophyes balioleuca is a species of moth of the family Tortricidae. It is found in Micronesia.
