= Adoxophyes parastropha =

Scientific classification
- Kingdom: Animalia
- Phylum: Arthropoda
- Class: Insecta
- Order: Lepidoptera
- Family: Tortricidae
- Genus: Adoxophyes
- Species: A. parastropha

Binomial name
- Adoxophyes parastropha Meyrick, 1912

Synonyms
- Adoxophyes centroluta Diakonoff, 1951

Species of moth

Adoxophyes parastropha is a moth of the family Tortricidae. It is found in India, Nepal and Vietnam.
