= Adoxophyes panxantha =

Scientific classification
- Domain: Eukaryota
- Kingdom: Animalia
- Phylum: Arthropoda
- Class: Insecta
- Order: Lepidoptera
- Family: Tortricidae
- Genus: Adoxophyes
- Species: A. panxantha

Binomial name
- Adoxophyes panxantha (Lower, 1901)

Synonyms
- Capua panxantha Lower, 1901

Species of moth

Adoxophyes panxantha is a species of moth of the family Tortricidae first described by Oswald Bertram Lower in 1901. It is found in Australia, where it has been recorded from Queensland.

The wingspan is 16–20 mm. The forewings are yellow ochreous, with pale glistening iridescence and with darker strigulae (fine streaks). The markings are indicated by dark reddish-fuscous irroration (speckling). The hindwings are ochreous, the dorsal third tinged with fuscous.
