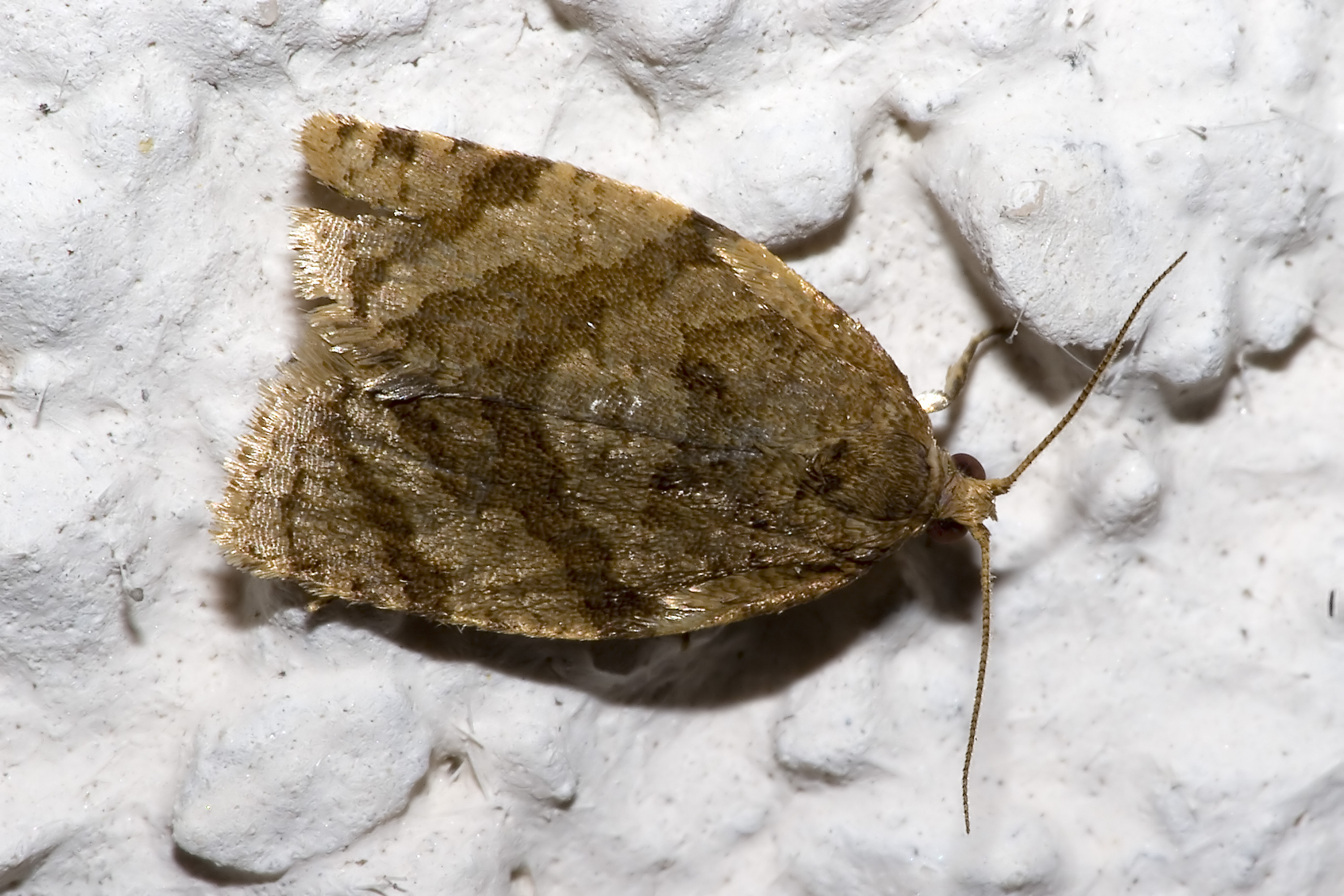
- Adoxophyes orana

Scientific classification
- Kingdom: Animalia
- Phylum: Arthropoda
- Class: Insecta
- Order: Lepidoptera
- Family: Tortricidae
- Tribe: Archipini
- Genus: Adoxophyes (Meyrick, 1881)

= Adoxophyes =

Genus of tortrix moths

Adoxophyes is a genus of moths of the tribe Archipini.

== Species ==
- Adoxophyes acrocindina Diakonoff, 1983
- Adoxophyes afonini Razowski, 2009
- Adoxophyes aniara Diakonoff, 1941
- Adoxophyes aurantia Clarke, 1976
- Adoxophyes aurantiana Bradley, 1961
- Adoxophyes aurata Diakonoff, 1968
- Adoxophyes balioleuca Clarke, 1976
- Adoxophyes beijingensis Zhou, Qui & Fu, 1997
- Adoxophyes bematica Meyrick, 1910
- Adoxophyes chloromydra Meyrick, 1926
- Adoxophyes congruana (Walker, 1863)
- Adoxophyes controversa Diakonoff, 1952
- Adoxophyes croesus Diakonoff, 1975
- Adoxophyes cyrtosema Meyrick, 1886
- Adoxophyes dubia Yasuda, 1998
- Adoxophyes ergatica Meyrick, 1911
- Adoxophyes fasciata Walsingham, 1900
- Adoxophyes fasciculana (Walker, 1866)
- Adoxophyes flagrans Meyrick, 1912
- Adoxophyes furcatana (Walker, 1863)
- Adoxophyes heteroidana Meyrick, 1881
- Adoxophyes honmai Yasuda, 1998
- Adoxophyes horographa Meyrick, 1928
- Adoxophyes instillata Meyrick, 1922
- Adoxophyes lacertana Razowski, 2013
- Adoxophyes liberatrix (Diakonoff, 1947)
- Adoxophyes libralis Meyrick, 1927
- Adoxophyes luctuosa Razowski, 2013
- Adoxophyes marmarygodes Diakonoff, 1952
- Adoxophyes meion Razowski, 2013
- Adoxophyes melia Clarke, 1976
- Adoxophyes melichroa (Lower, 1899)
- Adoxophyes microptycha Diakonoff, 1957
- Adoxophyes moderatana (Walker, 1863)
- Adoxophyes molybdaina Clarke, 1976
- Adoxophyes nebrodes Meyrick, 1920
- Adoxophyes negundana (McDunnough, 1923) – shimmering adoxophyes moth
- Adoxophyes nemorum Diakonoff, 1941
- Adoxophyes olethra Razowski, 2013
- Adoxophyes orana (Fischer von Rslerstamm, 1834) – summer fruit tortrix moth
- Adoxophyes panurga Razowski, 2013
- Adoxophyes panxantha (Lower, 1901)
- Adoxophyes parameca Razowski, 2013
- Adoxophyes parastropha Meyrick, 1912
- Adoxophyes perangusta Diakonoff, 196
- Adoxophyes peritoma Meyrick, 1918
- Adoxophyes perstricta Meyrick, 1928
- Adoxophyes planes Razowski, 2013
- Adoxophyes poecilogramma Clarke, 1976
- Adoxophyes privatana (Walker, 1863)
- Adoxophyes prosiliens Meyrick, 1928
- Adoxophyes psammocyma (Meyrick, 1908)
- Adoxophyes revoluta (Meyrick, 1908)
- Adoxophyes rhopalodesma Diakonoff, 1961
- Adoxophyes telesticta Meyrick, 1930
- Adoxophyes templana (Pagenstecher, 1900)
- Adoxophyes tetraphracta Meyrick, 1938
- Adoxophyes thoracica Diakonoff, 1941
- Adoxophyes tripselia (Lower, 1908)
- Adoxophyes trirhabda Diakonoff, 1969
- Adoxophyes vindicata Meyrick, 1910

== See also ==
- List of Tortricidae genera

== Bibliography ==
- Brown, J.W., 2005: World Catalogue of Insects volume 5 Tortricidae.
- Meyrick, 1881, Proc. Linn. Soc. N.S. W. 6: 429.
- Razowski, 2009, Tortricidae from Vietnam in the collection of the Berlin Museum.5. Archipini and Sparganothini (Lepidoptera: Tortricidae), Shilap revista de Lepidopterologia 37 (145): 41-60.
- Yasuda, T., 1998: The Japanese species of the genus Adoxophyes Meyrick (Lepidoptera, Tortricidae). Transactions of the Lepidopterological Society of Japan 49(3): 159-173. Abstract and full article: .
