= Adoxophyes flagrans =

Scientific classification
- Kingdom: Animalia
- Phylum: Arthropoda
- Class: Insecta
- Order: Lepidoptera
- Family: Tortricidae
- Genus: Adoxophyes
- Species: A. flagrans

Binomial name
- Adoxophyes flagrans Meyrick, 1912

Species of moth

Adoxophyes flagrans is a species of moth of the family Tortricidae. It is found in Myanmar.
