= Adoxophyes trirhabda =

Scientific classification
- Domain: Eukaryota
- Kingdom: Animalia
- Phylum: Arthropoda
- Class: Insecta
- Order: Lepidoptera
- Family: Tortricidae
- Genus: Adoxophyes
- Species: A. trirhabda

Binomial name
- Adoxophyes trirhabda Diakonoff, 1969

Species of moth

Adoxophyes trirhabda is a species of moth of the family Tortricidae. It is found in Papua New Guinea.
