= Adoxophyes controversa =

Scientific classification
- Kingdom: Animalia
- Phylum: Arthropoda
- Clade: Pancrustacea
- Class: Insecta
- Order: Lepidoptera
- Family: Tortricidae
- Genus: Adoxophyes
- Species: A. controversa

Binomial name
- Adoxophyes controversa Diakonoff, 1952

Species of moth

Adoxophyes controversa is a species of moth of the family Tortricidae. It is found in New Guinea by Alexey Diakonoff in 1952.

Adoxophyes controversa was described by Dutch-Russian entomologist Alexey Diakonoff in 1952. The original description was published as part of his work on New Guinea Tortricidae. In a later taxonomic study, Józef Razowski identified Adoxophyes panurga as a species related to A. controversa. Razowski distinguished A. panurga from A. controversa by characteristics including its whitish forewing ground colour and a distinct ventral process on part of the sacculus.
