= Adoxophyes acrocindina =

Scientific classification
- Domain: Eukaryota
- Kingdom: Animalia
- Phylum: Arthropoda
- Class: Insecta
- Order: Lepidoptera
- Family: Tortricidae
- Genus: Adoxophyes
- Species: A. acrocindina

Binomial name
- Adoxophyes acrocindina Diakonoff, 1983

Species of moth

Adoxophyes acrocindina is a species of moth of the family Tortricidae first described by Alexey Diakonoff in 1983. It is found in Indonesia on Sumatra and Seram. The habitat consists of dipterocarp forest, cassowary forest, lower and upper montane forests.
