= Adoxophyes vindicata =

Scientific classification
- Kingdom: Animalia
- Phylum: Arthropoda
- Class: Insecta
- Order: Lepidoptera
- Family: Tortricidae
- Genus: Adoxophyes
- Species: A. vindicata

Binomial name
- Adoxophyes vindicata Meyrick, 1910

Species of moth

Adoxophyes vindicata is a species of moth of the family Tortricidae. It is found on the Solomon Islands.

The wingspan is about 17 mm (0.67 in). The forewings are whitish-ochreous, the basal patch indicated by median and subdorsal ferruginous streaks and the central fascia represented by dark fuscous triangular costal and dorsal spots connected by a ferruginous stria. The hindwings are ochreous-whitish.
