= Adoxophyes tetraphracta =

Scientific classification
- Kingdom: Animalia
- Phylum: Arthropoda
- Class: Insecta
- Order: Lepidoptera
- Family: Tortricidae
- Genus: Adoxophyes
- Species: A. tetraphracta

Binomial name
- Adoxophyes tetraphracta Meyrick, 1938

Synonyms
- Adoxophyes acropeta Diakonoff, 1952

Species of moth

Adoxophyes tetraphracta is a species of moth of the family Tortricidae. It is found in New Guinea and Vietnam.

The wingspan is 13–15 mm.

The larvae feed on Theobroma cacao.
