= Adoxophyes panurga =

Scientific classification
- Kingdom: Animalia
- Phylum: Arthropoda
- Class: Insecta
- Order: Lepidoptera
- Family: Tortricidae
- Genus: Adoxophyes
- Species: A. panurga

Binomial name
- Adoxophyes panurga Razowski, 2013

Species of moth

Adoxophyes panurga is a species of moth of the family Tortricidae first described by Józef Razowski in 2013. It is found on Seram Island in Indonesia. The habitat consists of lower montane forests and alluvial forests.

The wingspan is about 22 mm.
