= Adoxophyes liberatrix =

Scientific classification
- Domain: Eukaryota
- Kingdom: Animalia
- Phylum: Arthropoda
- Class: Insecta
- Order: Lepidoptera
- Family: Tortricidae
- Genus: Adoxophyes
- Species: A. liberatrix

Binomial name
- Adoxophyes liberatrix (Diakonoff, 1947)

Synonyms
- Procalyptis liberatrix Diakonoff, 1947

Species of moth

Adoxophyes liberatrix is a species of moth of the family Tortricidae. It is found on Christmas Island, a territory of Australia in the Indian Ocean.
