= Adoxophyes parameca =

Scientific classification
- Kingdom: Animalia
- Phylum: Arthropoda
- Class: Insecta
- Order: Lepidoptera
- Family: Tortricidae
- Genus: Adoxophyes
- Species: A. parameca

Binomial name
- Adoxophyes parameca Razowski, 2013

Species of moth

Adoxophyes parameca is a species of moth of the family Tortricidae first described by Józef Razowski in 2013. It is found on Seram Island in Indonesia. The habitat consists of upper montane forests.

The wingspan is about 24 mm.

== Etymology ==
The species name refers to the ductus seminalis and is derived from Greek paramekes (meaning elongate).
