= Adoxophyes lacertana =

Scientific classification
- Domain: Eukaryota
- Kingdom: Animalia
- Phylum: Arthropoda
- Class: Insecta
- Order: Lepidoptera
- Family: Tortricidae
- Genus: Adoxophyes
- Species: A. lacertana

Binomial name
- Adoxophyes lacertana Razowski, 2013

Species of insect

Adoxophyes lacertana is a species of moth of the family Tortricidae first described by Józef Razowski in 2013. It is found on Seram Island of Indonesia. The habitat consists of dipterocarp forests and secondary forests.

The wingspan is about 25 mm for males and 18 mm for females.
