= Adoxophyes perstricta =

Scientific classification
- Kingdom: Animalia
- Phylum: Arthropoda
- Class: Insecta
- Order: Lepidoptera
- Family: Tortricidae
- Genus: Adoxophyes
- Species: A. perstricta

Binomial name
- Adoxophyes perstricta Meyrick, 1928

Species of moth

Adoxophyes perstricta is a species of moth of the family Tortricidae first described by Edward Meyrick in 1928. It is found from the Philippines to New Guinea, New Britain and Java.
