= Adoxophyes bematica =

Scientific classification
- Kingdom: Animalia
- Phylum: Arthropoda
- Class: Insecta
- Order: Lepidoptera
- Family: Tortricidae
- Genus: Adoxophyes
- Species: A. bematica

Binomial name
- Adoxophyes bematica Meyrick, 1910

Species of moth

Adoxophyes bematica is a species of moth of the family Tortricidae. It is found on the Solomon Islands to the east of Papua New Guinea.

The wingspan is 23–25 mm. The forewings are pale whitish-ochreous. The edge of the basal patch and of a narrow central fascia are indicated only by a few small dark ferruginous-fuscous strigulae. There is an elongate-triangular brown patch marked with dark fuscous and grey extending along the costa from to near the apex. The hindwings are ochreous-whitish.
