= Adoxophyes telesticta =

Scientific classification
- Kingdom: Animalia
- Phylum: Arthropoda
- Class: Insecta
- Order: Lepidoptera
- Family: Tortricidae
- Genus: Adoxophyes
- Species: A. telesticta

Binomial name
- Adoxophyes telesticta Meyrick, 1930

Synonyms
- Adoxophyes telestica

Species of moth

Adoxophyes telesticta is a species of moth of the family Tortricidae. It is found on Mauritius and Madagascar.

The larvae feed on Citrus aurantifolia and Eugenia parkeri.
