= Adoxophyes psammocyma =

Scientific classification
- Kingdom: Animalia
- Phylum: Arthropoda
- Class: Insecta
- Order: Lepidoptera
- Family: Tortricidae
- Genus: Adoxophyes
- Species: A. psammocyma

Binomial name
- Adoxophyes psammocyma (Meyrick, 1908)

Synonyms
- Epagoge psammocyma Meyrick, 1908

Species of moth

Adoxophyes psammocyma is a species of moth of the family Tortricidae. It is found in India.
