= Adoxophyes horographa =

Scientific classification
- Kingdom: Animalia
- Phylum: Arthropoda
- Class: Insecta
- Order: Lepidoptera
- Family: Tortricidae
- Genus: Adoxophyes
- Species: A. horographa

Binomial name
- Adoxophyes horographa Meyrick, 1928

Species of moth

Adoxophyes horographa is a species of moth of the family Tortricidae. It is found on the Bismarck Archipelago in the western Pacific Ocean.
