= Adoxophyes revoluta =

Scientific classification
- Kingdom: Animalia
- Phylum: Arthropoda
- Class: Insecta
- Order: Lepidoptera
- Family: Tortricidae
- Genus: Adoxophyes
- Species: A. revoluta

Binomial name
- Adoxophyes revoluta (Meyrick, 1908)

Synonyms
- Epagoge revoluta Meyrick, 1908

Species of moth

Adoxophyes revoluta is a species of moth of the family Tortricidae. It is found in Assam, India.
