= Adoxophyes prosiliens =

Scientific classification
- Kingdom: Animalia
- Phylum: Arthropoda
- Class: Insecta
- Order: Lepidoptera
- Family: Tortricidae
- Genus: Adoxophyes
- Species: A. prosiliens

Binomial name
- Adoxophyes prosiliens Meyrick, 1928

Species of moth

Adoxophyes prosiliens is a moth of the family Tortricidae. It is found in Vietnam and on the Andaman Islands in the Indian Ocean.
