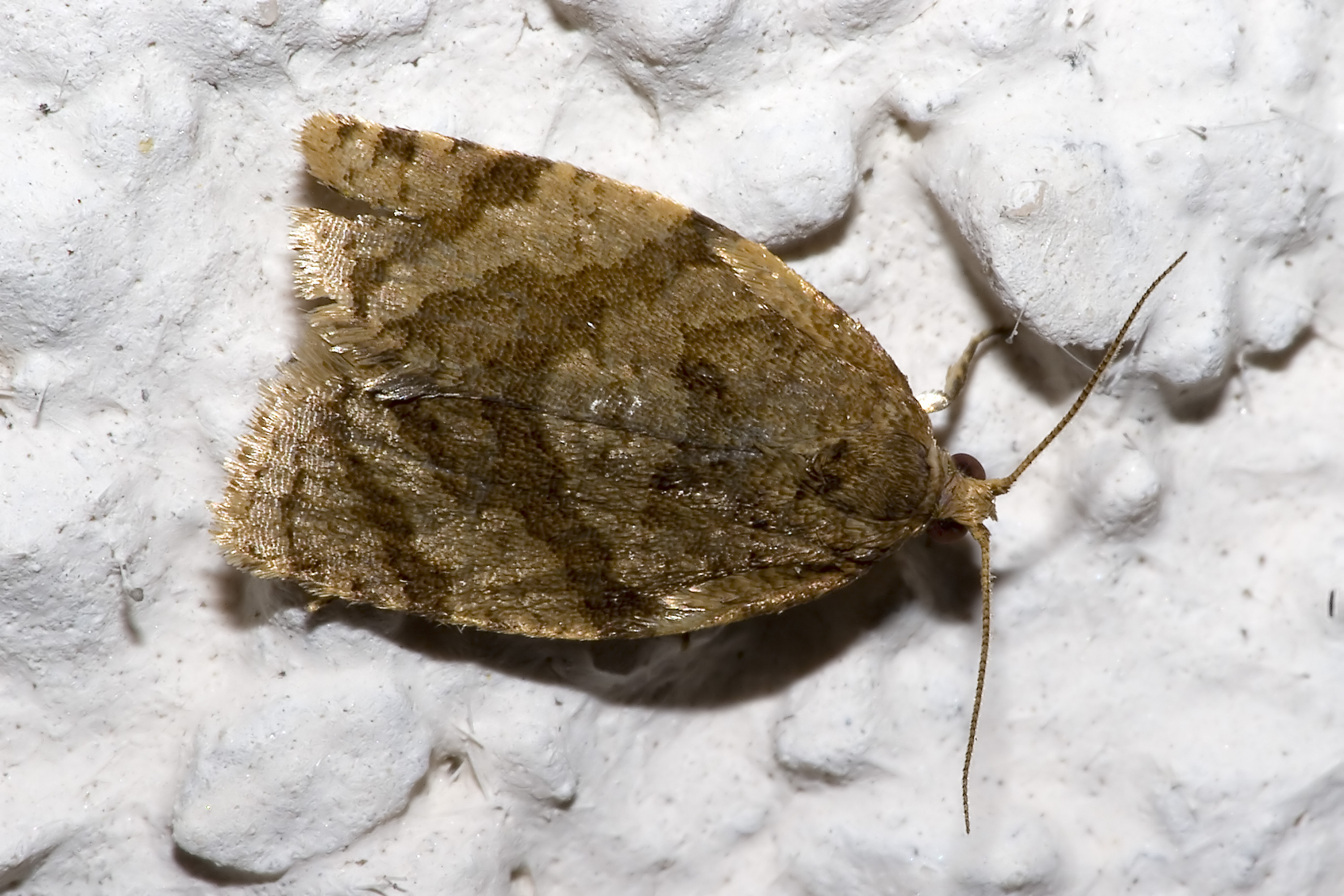

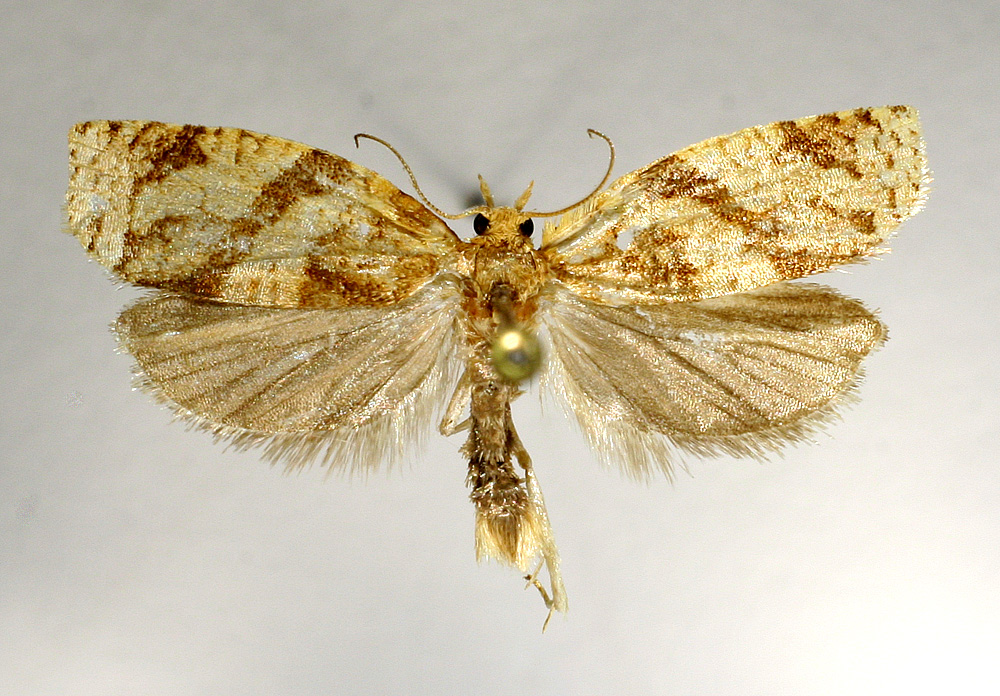

Scientific classification
- Kingdom: Animalia
- Phylum: Arthropoda
- Clade: Pancrustacea
- Class: Insecta
- Order: Lepidoptera
- Family: Tortricidae
- Genus: Adoxophyes
- Species: A. orana

Binomial name
- Adoxophyes orana (Fischer von Röslerstamm, 1834)

Synonyms
- Tortrix orana Fischer von Röslerstamm, 1834

= Adoxophyes orana =

Summer fruit tortrix moth

Adoxophyes orana, the summer fruit tortrix, is a moth of the family Tortricidae. It is found in the Palearctic realm and Taiwan.

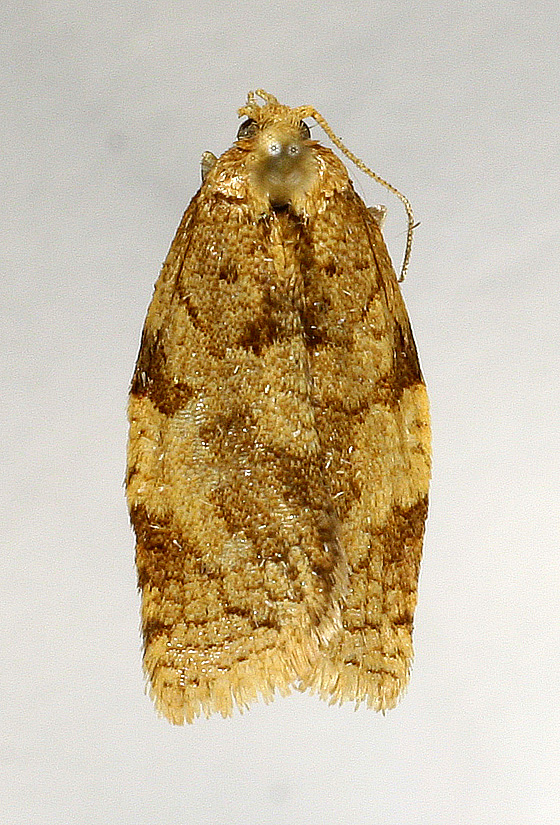

The wingspan is 17–22 mm. The moth flies in two generations from May to November. The larvae overwinter in loosely woven cocoons.

The larvae feed on various trees and shrubs with a preference for Rosaceous plants, particularly apple (Malus domestica) and pear (Prunus pyrifolia). The species is considered an agricultural pest due to the damage the larvae do to fruit trees while feeding.
