= Adoxophyes olethra =

Scientific classification
- Kingdom: Animalia
- Phylum: Arthropoda
- Class: Insecta
- Order: Lepidoptera
- Family: Tortricidae
- Genus: Adoxophyes
- Species: A. olethra

Binomial name
- Adoxophyes olethra Razowski, 2013

Species of moth

Adoxophyes olethra is a species of moth of the family Tortricidae first described by Józef Razowski in 2013. It is found on Seram Island in Indonesia. The habitat consists of upper montane forests.

The wingspan is about 14 mm.
