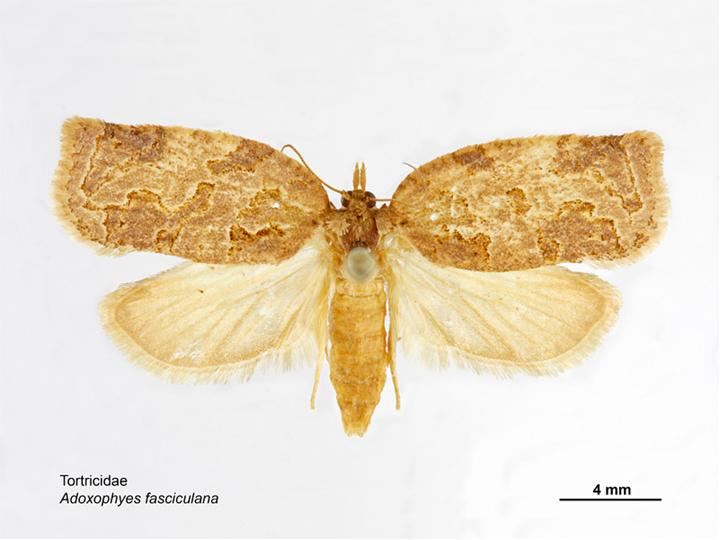
- Dorsal view
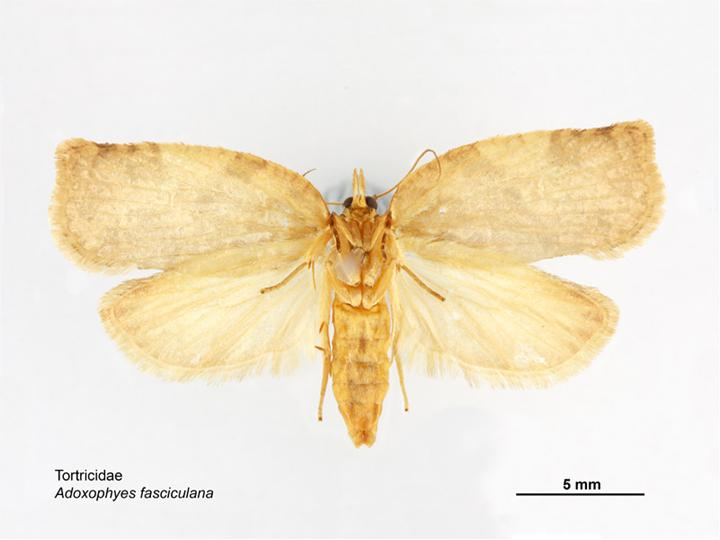
- Ventral view

Scientific classification
- Kingdom: Animalia
- Phylum: Arthropoda
- Class: Insecta
- Order: Lepidoptera
- Family: Tortricidae
- Genus: Adoxophyes
- Species: A. fasciculana

Binomial name
- Adoxophyes fasciculana (Walker, 1866)

Synonyms
- Tortrix fasciculana Walker, 1866; Adoxophyes asciculata Meyrick, in Wagner, 1912; Capua epipepla Lower, 1908; Tortrix luzonica Sauber, in Semper, 1902

= Adoxophyes fasciculana =

Species of moth

Adoxophyes fasciculana, the bell moth or orange tip moth, is a moth of the family Tortricidae. It was described by Francis Walker in 1866 from the Moluccas. It is also known from South Asia, Vietnam, Australia and the Pacific Islands. It is a polyphagous pest on several commercially important crops.

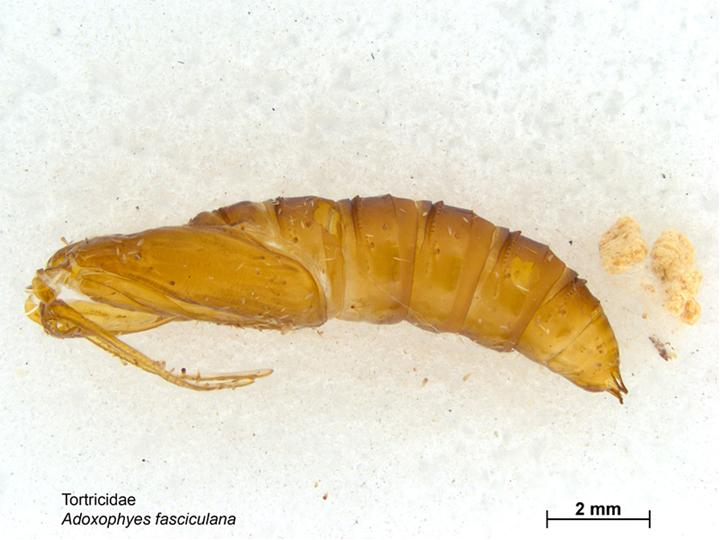
Pupa

== Description ==
The wingspan is 14–18 mm.

== Larval food plants ==
- Ageratum conyzoides
- Amaranthus viridis
- Arachis hypogaea
- Averrhoa carambola
- Camellia limonia
- Camellia sinensis
- Carica papaya
- Emilia longifolia
- Euphorbia hirta
- Euphorbia longan
- Gnaphalium indicum
- Gossypium barbadense
- Helianthus annuus
- Indigofera endecaphylla
- Ipomoea batatas
- Litchi chinensis
- Morus alba
- Passiflora foetida
- Ricinus communis
- Rosa rugosa
- Scutellaria barbata
