= Adoxophyes aurantiana =

Scientific classification
- Domain: Eukaryota
- Kingdom: Animalia
- Phylum: Arthropoda
- Class: Insecta
- Order: Lepidoptera
- Family: Tortricidae
- Genus: Adoxophyes
- Species: A. aurantiana

Binomial name
- Adoxophyes aurantiana Bradley, 1961

Species of moth

Adoxophyes aurantiana is a species of moth of the family Tortricidae. It is found on the Solomon Islands, Guadalcanal and Papua New Guinea.

This species has a wingspan of 12–16 mm for the females and 17–20 mm for the males.
