= Adoxophyes ergatica =

Scientific classification
- Kingdom: Animalia
- Phylum: Arthropoda
- Class: Insecta
- Order: Lepidoptera
- Family: Tortricidae
- Genus: Adoxophyes
- Species: A. ergatica

Binomial name
- Adoxophyes ergatica Meyrick, 1911

Species of moth

Adoxophyes ergatica is a species of moth of the family Tortricidae. It is found on Mauritius and the Seychelles (Mahé, Silhouette, Coëtivy, Desroches).
