= Adoxophyes microptycha =

Scientific classification
- Domain: Eukaryota
- Kingdom: Animalia
- Phylum: Arthropoda
- Class: Insecta
- Order: Lepidoptera
- Family: Tortricidae
- Genus: Adoxophyes
- Species: A. microptycha

Binomial name
- Adoxophyes microptycha Diakonoff, 1957

Species of moth

Adoxophyes microptycha is a species of moth of the family Tortricidae. It is found on Réunion in the Indian Ocean.
