= Adoxophyes moderatana =

Scientific classification
- Kingdom: Animalia
- Phylum: Arthropoda
- Class: Insecta
- Order: Lepidoptera
- Family: Tortricidae
- Genus: Adoxophyes
- Species: A. moderatana

Binomial name
- Adoxophyes moderatana (Walker, 1863)

Synonyms
- Tortrix moderatana Walker, 1863; Adoxophyes epizeucta Meyrick, 1910; ?Parascaptia insignifica Rothschild, 1915

Species of moth

Adoxophyes moderatana is a species of moth of the family Tortricidae. It is found in India (the Andaman Islands), Borneo, New Guinea and the Solomon Islands.

The larvae feed on the leaves of Paraserianthus falcateria.
