= Adoxophyes fasciata =

Scientific classification
- Domain: Eukaryota
- Kingdom: Animalia
- Phylum: Arthropoda
- Class: Insecta
- Order: Lepidoptera
- Family: Tortricidae
- Genus: Adoxophyes
- Species: A. fasciata

Binomial name
- Adoxophyes fasciata Walsingham, 1900

Synonyms
- Archips minor Shiraki, 1913; Tortrix reticulana Hubner, [1818-1819]; Capua sutschana Caradja, 1926

Species of moth

Adoxophyes fasciata is a species of moth of the family Tortricidae. It is found in Japan (Honshu, Hokkaido), Taiwan and China.

The length of the forewings is 7–9 mm for males and 9–11.5 mm for females.
