= Adoxophyes rhopalodesma =

Scientific classification
- Domain: Eukaryota
- Kingdom: Animalia
- Phylum: Arthropoda
- Class: Insecta
- Order: Lepidoptera
- Family: Tortricidae
- Genus: Adoxophyes
- Species: A. rhopalodesma

Binomial name
- Adoxophyes rhopalodesma Diakonoff, 1961

Species of moth

Adoxophyes rhopalodesma is a species of moth of the family Tortricidae. It is found on Waigeu Island in Indonesia.
