= Adoxophyes croesus =

Scientific classification
- Domain: Eukaryota
- Kingdom: Animalia
- Phylum: Arthropoda
- Class: Insecta
- Order: Lepidoptera
- Family: Tortricidae
- Genus: Adoxophyes
- Species: A. croesus

Binomial name
- Adoxophyes croesus Diakonoff, 1975

Species of moth

Adoxophyes croesus is a species of moth of the family Tortricidae. It is found on Sulawesi, an island in Indonesia.
