= Adoxophyes aurata =

Scientific classification
- Domain: Eukaryota
- Kingdom: Animalia
- Phylum: Arthropoda
- Class: Insecta
- Order: Lepidoptera
- Family: Tortricidae
- Genus: Adoxophyes
- Species: A. aurata

Binomial name
- Adoxophyes aurata Diakonoff, 1968

Species of moth

Adoxophyes aurata is a species of moth of the family Tortricidae. It is found on the island of Luzon in the Philippines.

The wingspan is 14–15 mm for males and 17–19 mm for females. The forewings are whitish yellow, with a golden gloss and with tawny lilac markings, edged with dark brown or entirely dark brown. The costal edge is suffused with bright yellow ochreous. The hindwings are semitransparent, pale yellow with a pinkish-golden gloss.
