= Adoxophyes chloromydra =

Scientific classification
- Kingdom: Animalia
- Phylum: Arthropoda
- Class: Insecta
- Order: Lepidoptera
- Family: Tortricidae
- Genus: Adoxophyes
- Species: A. chloromydra

Binomial name
- Adoxophyes chloromydra Meyrick, 1926

Species of moth

Adoxophyes chloromydra is a species of moth of the family Tortricidae. It is found on Borneo.
