= Scopula aniara =

Scientific classification
- Kingdom: Animalia
- Phylum: Arthropoda
- Class: Insecta
- Order: Lepidoptera
- Family: Geometridae
- Genus: Scopula
- Species: S. aniara

Binomial name
- Scopula aniara Prout, 1934

Synonyms
- Scopula perlineata Schaus, 1913 (preocc. Walker)

Species of geometer moth in subfamily Sterrhinae

Scopula aniara is a moth of the family Geometridae. It was described by Prout in 1934. It is endemic to Costa Rica.
