= Population cycle =

Cyclical change in a species' population

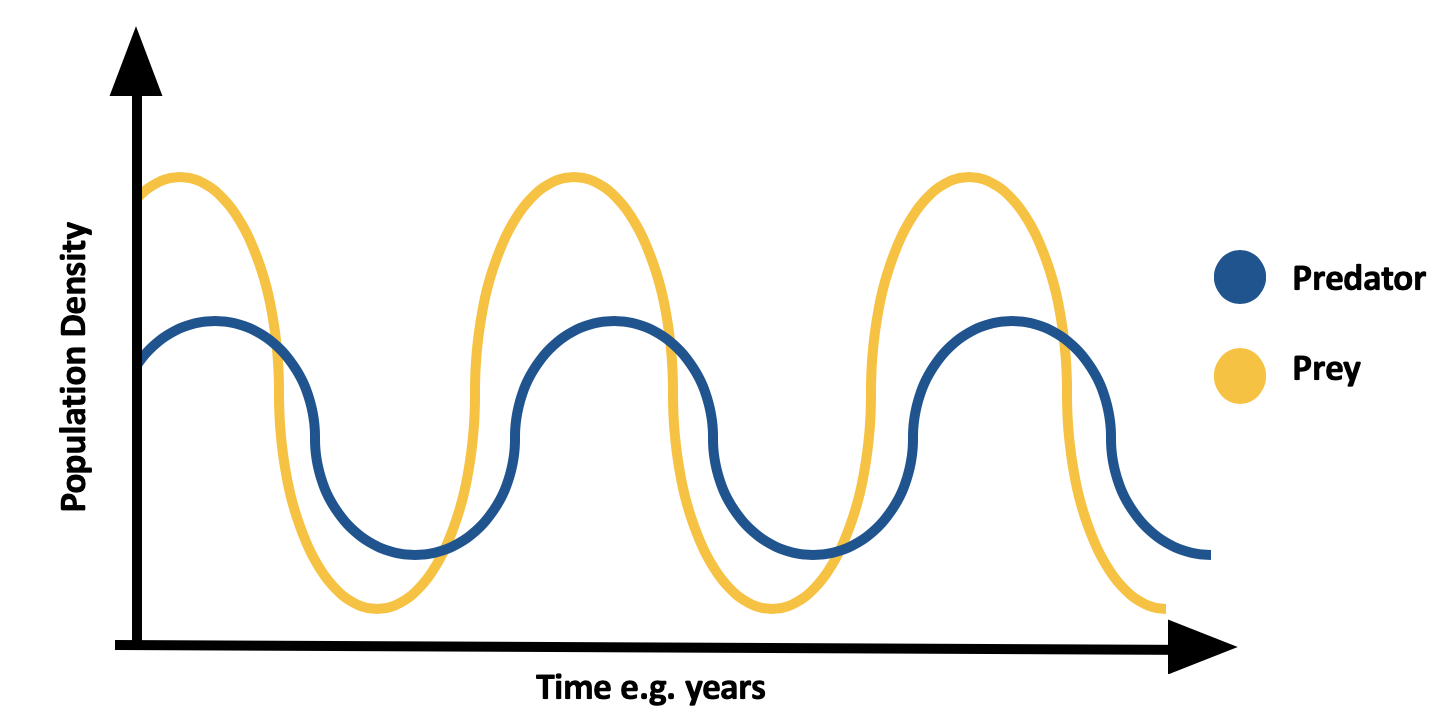
Abstract representation of predator and prey populations over time: when a prey species become scarce its predators find it harder to find food and so their population falls; this makes the prey population safer, and able to become more abundant again

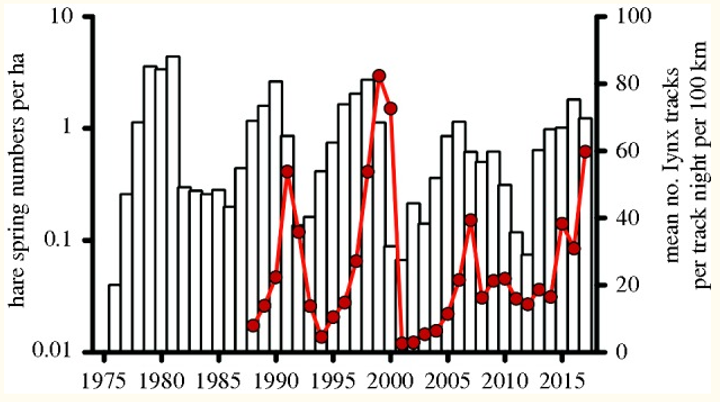
Cyclical fluctuations in the density of a hare population over time

A population cycle in zoology is a phenomenon where populations rise and fall over a predictable period of time. There are some species where population numbers have reasonably predictable patterns of change although the full reasons for population cycles is one of the major unsolved ecological problems. There are a number of factors which influence population change such as availability of food, predators, diseases and climate.

== Occurrence in mammal populations ==
Olaus Magnus, the Archbishop of Uppsala in central Sweden, identified that species of northern rodents had periodic peaks in population and published two reports on the subject in the middle of the 16th century.

In North America, the phenomenon was identified in populations of the snowshoe hare. In 1865, trappers with the Hudson's Bay Company were catching plenty of animals. By 1870, they were catching very few. It was finally identified that the cycle of high and low catches ran over approximately a ten-year period.

The most well known example of creatures which have a population cycle is the lemming. The biologist Charles Sutherland Elton first identified in 1924 that the lemming had regular cycles of population growth and decline. When their population outgrows the resources of their habitat, lemmings migrate, although contrary to popular myth, they do not jump into the sea.

Mouse plagues in Australia happen at intervals of about four years.

== Other species ==
While the phenomenon is often associated with rodents, it does occur in other species such as the ruffed grouse. There are other species which have irregular population explosions such as grasshoppers where overpopulation results in locust swarms in Africa and Australia.

== Relationships between predators and prey ==
There is also an interaction between prey with periodic cycles and predators. As the population expands, there is more food available for predators. As it contracts, there is less food available for predators, putting pressure on their population numbers.

== Length ==
Each population cycle tends to last as long as a species' life expectancy (i.e. lemmings, rabbits and locusts)

== Among humans ==
There is strong evidence that humans also display population cycles. Societies as diverse as those of England and France during the Roman, medieval, and early modern eras, of Egypt during Greco-Roman and Ottoman rule, and of various dynasties in China all showed similar patterns of political instability and violence becoming considerably more common after times of relative peace, prosperity, and sustained population growth. Quantitatively, periods of unrest included many times more events of instability per decade and occurred when the population was declining, rather than increasing.

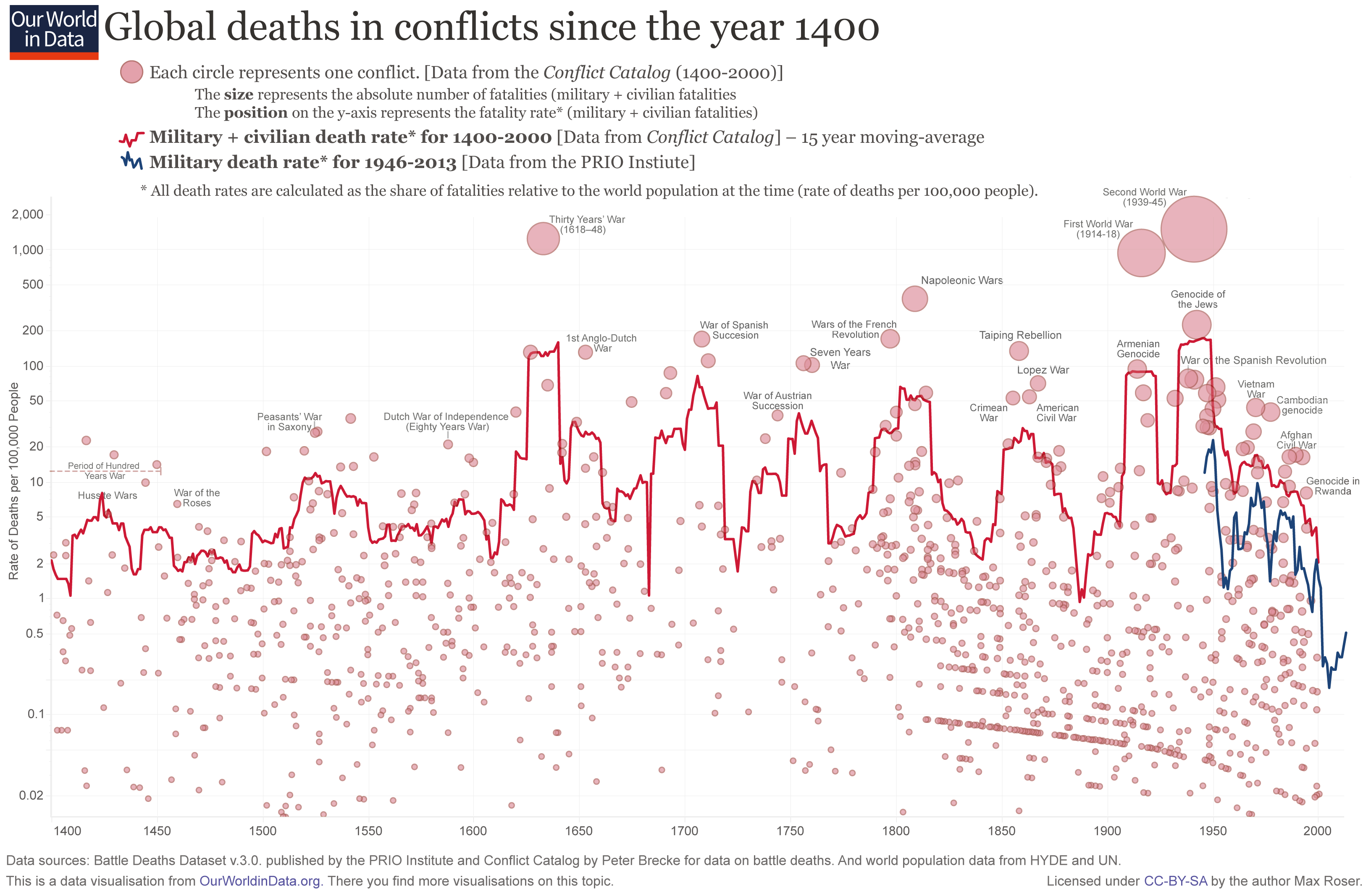
Military and civilian fatalities

== See also ==
- Irruptive growth
- Population dynamics
