= Adoxophyes honmai =

Scientific classification
- Kingdom: Animalia
- Phylum: Arthropoda
- Clade: Pancrustacea
- Class: Insecta
- Order: Lepidoptera
- Family: Tortricidae
- Genus: Adoxophyes
- Species: A. honmai

Binomial name
- Adoxophyes honmai Yasuda, 1998

Species of moth

Adoxophyes honmai, the summer fruit tortrix, is a species of moth of the family Tortricidae. It is found in Japan, where it has been recorded from Honshu and is possibly also present on Shikoku and Kyushu.

The length of the forewings is 7.3 mm for males and 8 mm for females.

The larvae feed on various trees and shrubs, including tea.
