= Density dependence =

Concept in population ecology

In population ecology, density dependence occurs when population growth rates are regulated by the population density. The concept affects macroparasite life cycles.

== Positive density-dependence ==
Positive density-dependence, density-dependent facilitation, or the Allee effect describes a situation in which population growth is facilitated by increased population density.

=== Examples ===
In dioecious (separate sex) obligatory parasites, mated female worms are required to complete a transmission cycle. At low parasite densities, the probability of a female worm encountering a male worm and forming a mating pair can become so low that reproduction is restricted due to single sex infections. At higher parasite densities, the probability of mating pairs forming and successful reproduction increases. This has been observed in the population dynamics of Schistosomes.

Positive density-dependence processes occur in macroparasite life cycles that rely on vectors with a cibarial armature, such as Anopheles or Culex mosquitoes. For Wuchereria bancrofti, a filarial nematode, well-developed cibarial armatures in vectors can damage ingested microfilariae and impede the development of infective L3 larvae. At low microfilariae densities, most microfilariae can be ruptured by teeth, preventing successful development of infective L3 larvae. As more larvae are ingested, the ones that become entangled in the teeth may protect the remaining larvae, which are then left undamaged during ingestion.

Positive density-dependence processes may also occur in macroparasite infections that lead to immunosuppression. Onchocerca volvulus infection promotes immunosuppressive processes within the human host that suppress immunity against incoming infective L3 larvae. This suppression of anti-parasite immunity causes parasite establishment rates to increase with higher parasite burden.

== Negative density-dependence ==
Negative density-dependence, or density-dependent restriction, describes a situation in which population growth is curtailed by crowding, predators and competition.

In cell biology, it describes the reduction in cell division. When a cell population reaches a certain density, the amount of required growth factors and nutrients available to each cell becomes insufficient to allow continued cell growth.

This is also true for other organisms because an increased density means an increase in intraspecific competition. Greater competition means an individual has a decreased contribution to the next generation i.e. offspring. Density-dependent mortality can be overcompensating, undercompensating or exactly compensating.

There also exists density-independent inhibition, where other factors such as weather or environmental conditions and disturbances may affect a population's carrying capacity.

An example of a density-dependent variable is crowding and competition.

=== Examples ===
Density-dependent fecundity

Density-dependent fecundity exists, where the birth rate falls as competition increases. In the context of gastrointestinal nematodes, the weight of female Ascaris lumbricoides and its rates of egg production decrease as host infection intensity increases. Thus, the per-capita contribution of each worm to transmission decreases as a function of infection intensity.

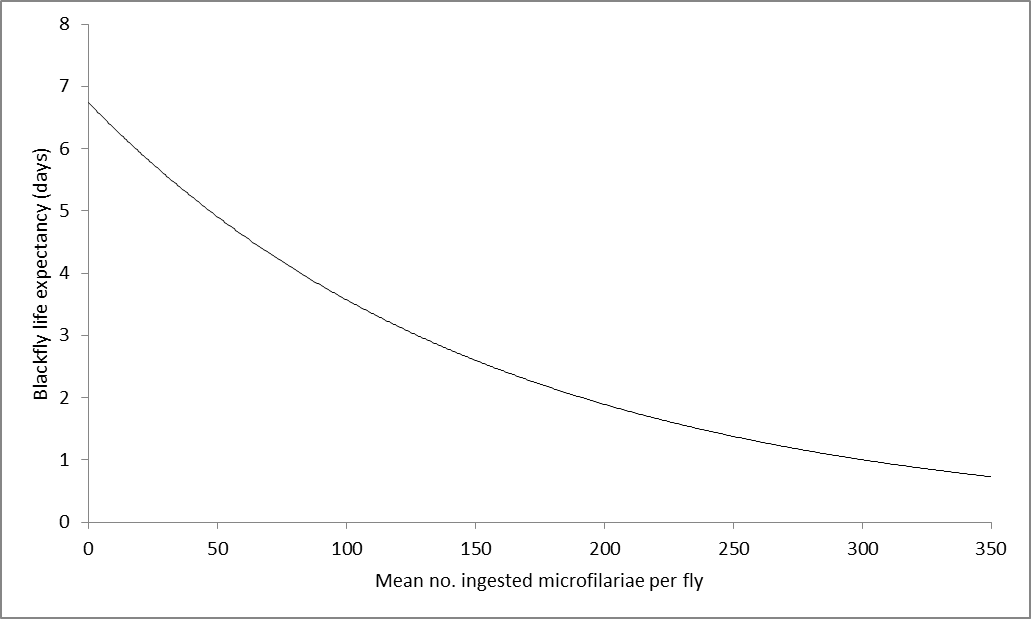
Parasite-induced vector mortality

Parasite-induced vector mortality is a form of negative density-dependence. The Onchocerciasis life cycle involves transmission via a black fly vector. In this life-cycle, the life expectancy of the black fly vector decreases as the worm load ingested by the vector increases. Because O. volvulus microfilariae require at least seven days to mature into infective L3 larvae in the black fly, the worm load is restricted to levels that allow the black fly to survive for long enough to pass infective L3 larvae onto humans.

== In macroparasite life cycles ==
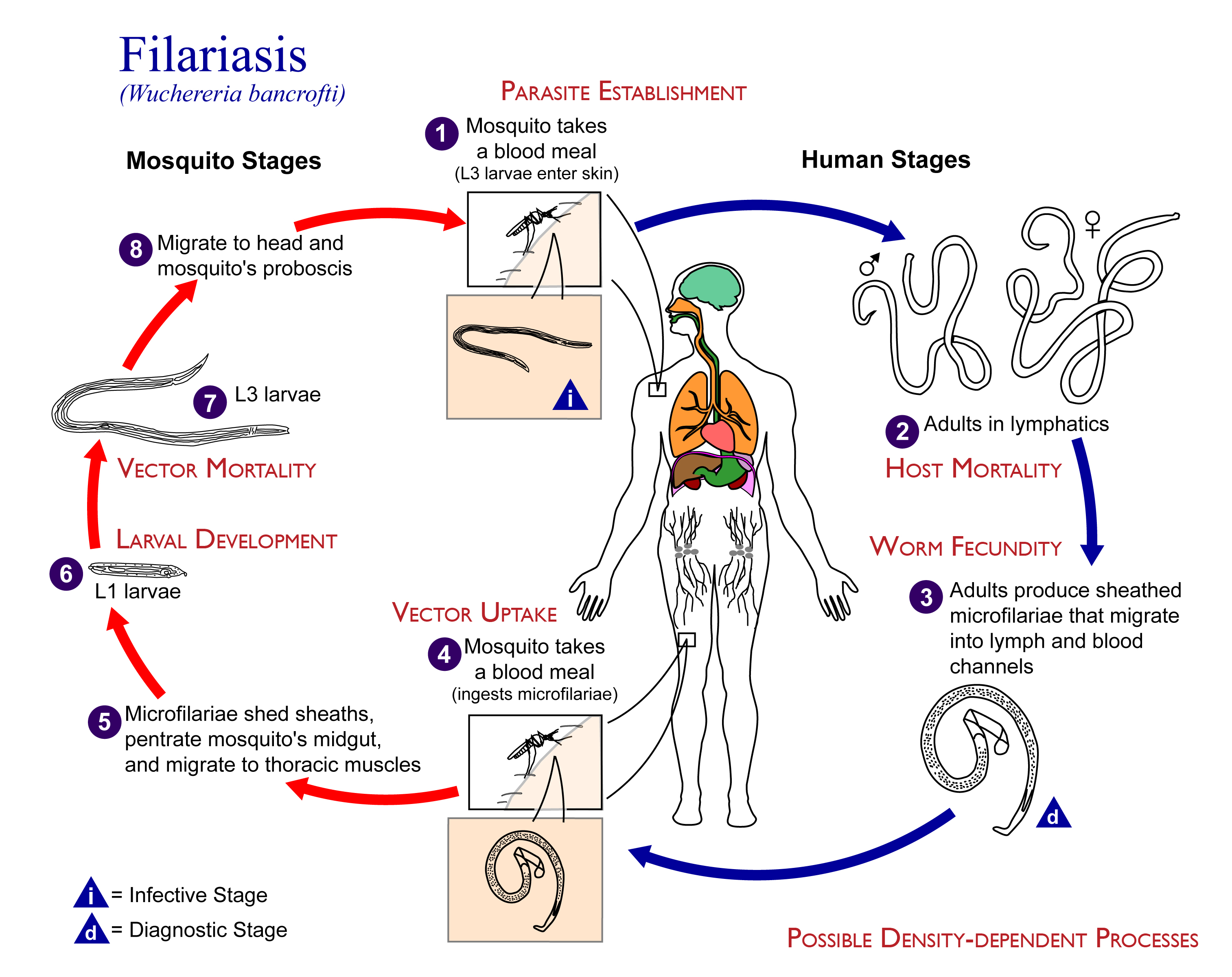
Density-dependence processes (red) in filariasis life cycle

In macroparasite life cycles, density-dependent processes can influence parasite fecundity, survival, and establishment. Density-dependent processes can act across multiple points of the macroparasite life cycle. For filarial worms, density-dependent processes can act at the host/vector interface or within the host/vector life-cycle stages. At the host/vector interface, density-dependence may influence the input of L3 larvae into the host's skin and the ingestion of microfilariae by the vector. Within the life-cycle stages taking place in the vector, density-dependence may influence the development of L3 larvae in vectors and vector life expectancy. Within the life-cycle stages taking place in the host, density-dependence may influence the development of microfilariae and host life expectancy.

In reality, combinations of negative (restriction) and positive (facilitation) density-dependent processes occur in the life cycles of parasites. However, the extent to which one process predominates over the other vary widely according to the parasite, vector, and host involved. This is illustrated by the W. bancrofti life cycle. In Culex mosquitoes, which lack a well-developed cibarial armature, restriction processes predominate. Thus, the number of L3 larvae per mosquito declines as the number of ingested microfilariae increases. Conversely, in Aedes and Anopheles mosquitoes, which have well-developed cibarial armatures, facilitation processes predominate. Consequently, the number of L3 larvae per mosquito increases as the number of ingested microfilariae increases.

== Implications for parasite persistence and control ==
Negative density-dependent (restriction) processes contribute to the resilience of macroparasite populations. At high parasite populations, restriction processes tend to restrict population growth rates and contribute to the stability of these populations. Interventions that lead to a reduction in parasite populations will cause a relaxation of density-dependent restrictions, increasing per-capita rates of reproduction or survival, thereby contributing to population persistence and resilience.

Contrariwise, positive density-dependent or facilitation processes make elimination of a parasite population more likely. Facilitation processes cause the reproductive success of the parasite to decrease with lower worm burden. Thus, control measures that reduce parasite burden will automatically reduce per-capita reproductive success and increase the likelihood of elimination when facilitation processes predominate.

=== Extinction threshold ===
The extinction threshold refers to minimum parasite density level for the parasite to persist in a population. Interventions that reduce parasite density to a level below this threshold will ultimately lead to the extinction of that parasite in that population. Facilitation processes increase the extinction threshold, making it easier to achieve using parasite control interventions. Conversely, restriction processes complicates control measures by decreasing the extinction threshold.

== Implications for parasite distribution ==
Anderson and Gordon (1982) propose that the distribution of macroparasites in a host population is regulated by a combination of positive and negative density-dependent processes. In overdispersed distributions, a small proportion of hosts harbour most of the parasite population. Positive density-dependent processes contribute to overdispersion of parasite populations, whereas negative density-dependent processes contribute to underdispersion of parasite populations. As mean parasite burden increases, negative density-dependent processes become more prominent and the distribution of the parasite population tends to become less overdispersed.

Consequently, interventions that lead to a reduction in parasite burden will tend to cause the parasite distribution to become overdispersed. For instance, time-series data for Onchocerciasis infection demonstrates that 10 years of vector control lead to reduced parasite burden with a more overdispersed distribution.

== See also ==
- Frequency-dependent selection
- Plant density
- Janzen–Connell hypothesis
