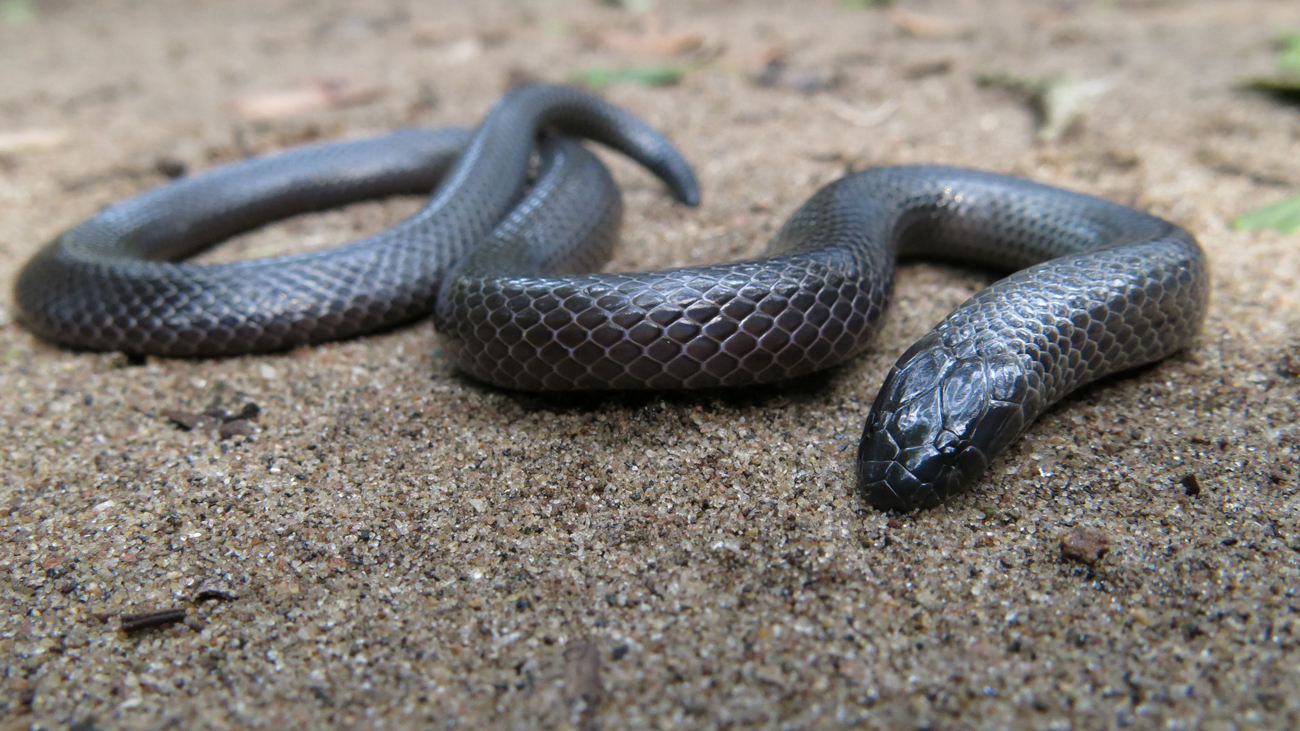

Scientific classification
- Kingdom: Animalia
- Phylum: Chordata
- Class: Reptilia
- Order: Squamata
- Suborder: Serpentes
- Family: Atractaspididae
- Genus: Amblyodipsas
- Species: A. polylepis

Binomial name
- Amblyodipsas polylepis (Bocage, 1873)

Synonyms
- Calamelaps polylepis Bocage, 1873

= Amblyodipsas polylepis =

Species of snake

Amblyodipsas polylepis, or the common purple-glossed snake, is a species of mildly venomous rear-fanged snake in the Atractaspididae family.

== Geographic range ==
It is endemic to the eastern and northern regions of southern Africa. More specifically, it is found in Angola, Namibia, Botswana, Democratic Republic of the Congo, Zambia, Mozambique, Zimbabwe, Malawi, Republic of South Africa, Tanzania, coastal Kenya, and Somalia.

== Description ==
Dorsal scales smooth, without pits, arranged in 21 rows, which is more than any other species of Amblyodipsas as the specific epithet, polylepis, implies. Ventrals 163–212; anal divided; subcaudals 16–27, divided. In every other respect scalation is like Amblyodipsas unicolor.

Completely blackish brown. Total length 40 cm (15 3/4 in); tail 23 mm (7/8 in).

== Diet ==
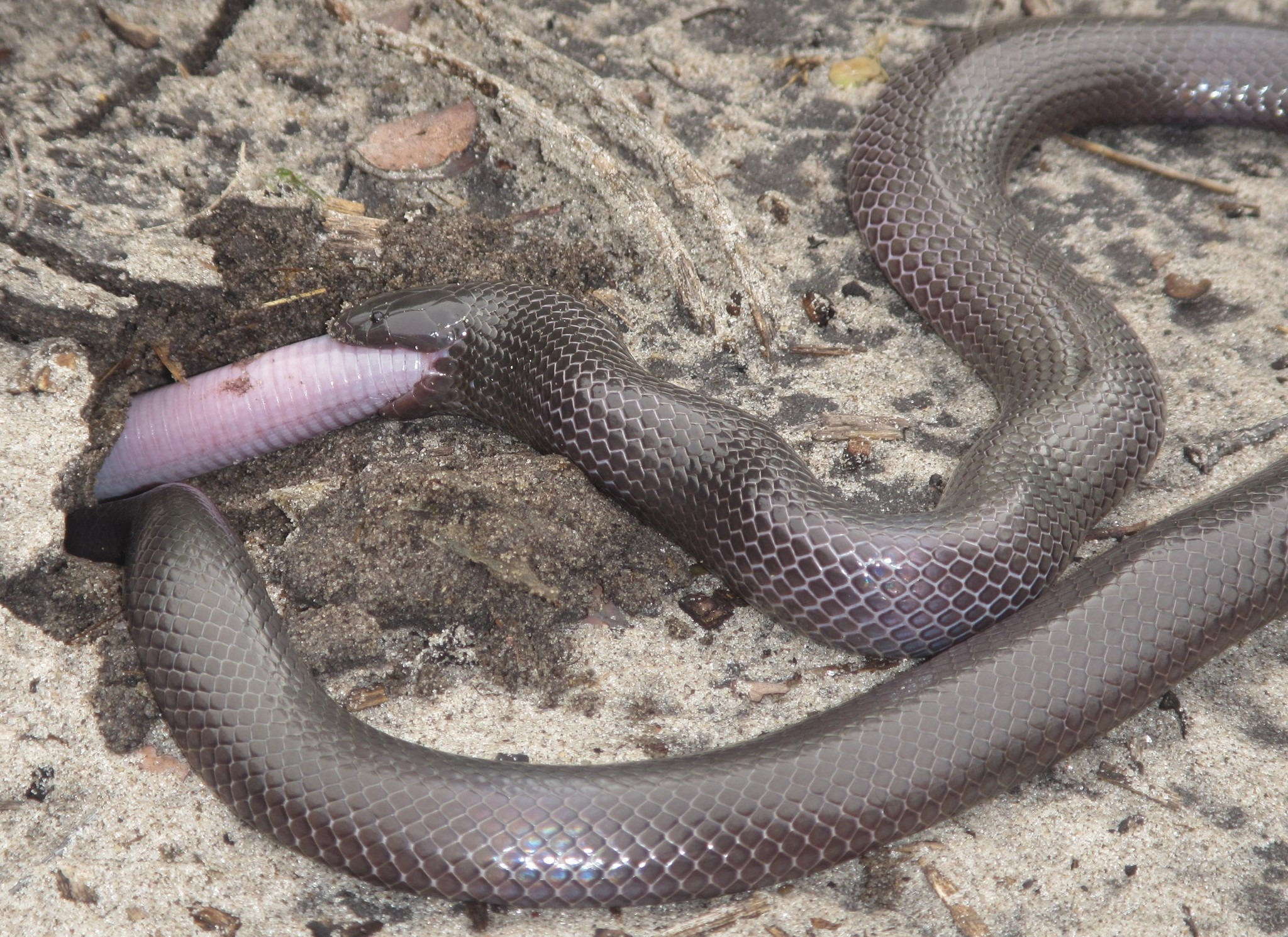
Eating an amphisbaenian

This species has been recorded to prey upon Monopeltis luandae, as well as other genera of Amphisbaenidae such as Zygaspis.
