= Lualaba worm lizard =

Scientific classification
- Kingdom: Animalia
- Phylum: Chordata
- Class: Reptilia
- Order: Squamata
- Clade: Amphisbaenia
- Family: Amphisbaenidae
- Genus: Monopeltis
- Species: M. adercae

Binomial name
- Monopeltis adercae de Witte, 1953

Species of amphisbaenian

The Lualaba worm lizard (Monopeltis adercae) is a species of amphisbaenian in the family Amphisbaenidae. The species is endemic to the Democratic Republic of the Congo.

== Etymology ==
The specific name, adercae, is in honor of Bernard Max Aderca, who was a Belgian geologist and paleontologist.

== Geographic range ==
M. adercae is found in southern Democratic Republic of the Congo, in the vicinity of Mulongo. The holotype was collected at an elevation of 617 m (2,024 ft).

== Description ==
The holotype of M. adercae has a total length of 360 mm (14 in), which includes a tail 57 mm (2.2 in) long. The diameter of the body is 9 mm (0.35 in).

== Reproduction ==
The mode of reproduction of M. adercae is unknown.
