= Monopeltis perplexus =

Conservation status
- Data Deficient (IUCN 3.1)

Scientific classification
- Kingdom: Animalia
- Phylum: Chordata
- Class: Reptilia
- Order: Squamata
- Clade: Amphisbaenia
- Family: Amphisbaenidae
- Genus: Monopeltis
- Species: M. perplexus

Binomial name
- Monopeltis perplexus Gans, 1976

Species of amphisbaenian

Monopeltis perplexus is a species of amphisbaenian in the family Amphisbaenidae. The species is endemic to Angola.

== Habitat ==
The preferred natural habitat of M. perplexus is unknown.

== Description ==
Small and slender for its genus, M. perplexus may attain a snout-to-vent length (SVL) of 30 cm (12 in). The tail is relatively long, greater than 10% SVL.

== Reproduction ==
The mode of reproduction of M. perplexus is unknown.
