= Middle Congo worm lizard =

Scientific classification
- Kingdom: Animalia
- Phylum: Chordata
- Class: Reptilia
- Order: Squamata
- Clade: Amphisbaenia
- Family: Amphisbaenidae
- Genus: Monopeltis
- Species: M. schoutedeni

Binomial name
- Monopeltis schoutedeni de Witte, 1933

Species of amphisbaenian

The Middle Congo worm lizard (Monopeltis schoutedeni) is a species of amphisbaenian in the family Amphisbaenidae. The species is indigenous to Central Africa.

== Etymology ==
The specific name, schoutedeni, is in honor of Belgian zoologist Henri Eugene Alphonse Hubert Schouteden.

== Geographic range ==
M. schoutedeni is found in the Democratic Republic of the Congo and Gabon.

== Reproduction ==
The mode of reproduction of M. schoutedeni is unknown.
