= Monopeltis zambezensis =

Scientific classification
- Kingdom: Animalia
- Phylum: Chordata
- Class: Reptilia
- Order: Squamata
- Clade: Amphisbaenia
- Family: Amphisbaenidae
- Genus: Monopeltis
- Species: M. zambezensis

Binomial name
- Monopeltis zambezensis Gans & Broadley, 1974

Species of amphisbaenian

Monopeltis zambezensis is a species of amphisbaenian in the family Amphisbaenidae. The species is indigenous to southern Africa.

== Geographic range ==
M. zambezensis is found in Zambia, Zimbabwe, and presumably western Mozambique.

== Habitat ==
The preferred natural habitat of M. zambezensis is red soil in Mopane woodlands.

== Description ==
M. zambezensis is very small and slender for its genus. Adults usually have a snout-to-vent length (SVL) of only 15–20 cm (5.9–7.9 in). The maximum recorded SVL is 23.5 cm (9.3 in).

== Reproduction ==
The mode of reproduction of M. zambezensis is unknown.
