= Monopeltis sphenorhynchus =

Scientific classification
- Kingdom: Animalia
- Phylum: Chordata
- Class: Reptilia
- Order: Squamata
- Clade: Amphisbaenia
- Family: Amphisbaenidae
- Genus: Monopeltis
- Species: M. sphenorhynchus

Binomial name
- Monopeltis sphenorhynchus W. Peters, 1879

Synonyms
- Monopeltis sphenorhynchus W. Peters, 1879; Lepidosternon sphenorhynchum Strauch, 1881; Monopeltis sphenorhynchus — Boulenger, 1885; Monopeltis mauricei Parker, 1935; Monopeltis habenichti V. FitzSimons, 1937; Monopeltis capensis gazei V. FitzSimons, 1937; Monopeltis ocularis V. FitzSimons, 1941; Monopeltis sphenorhynchus — Auerbach, 1987

Species of amphisbaenian

Monopeltis sphenorhynchus, also known commonly as Maurice's slender worm lizard, Maurice's spade-snouted worm lizard, and the slender spade-snouted worm lizard, is a species of amphisbaenian in the family Amphisbaenidae. The species is native to southern Africa. There are two recognized subspecies.

== Geographic range ==
M. sphenorhynchus is found in Botswana, Mozambique, and South Africa.

== Habitat ==
The preferred natural habitats of M. sphenorhynchus are deep sand and alluvial soil.

== Description ==
Slender and medium-sized for the genus, adults of M. sphenorhynchus usually have a snout-to-vent length (SVL) of 20–30 cm (7.9–11.8 in). The maximum recorded SVL is 32.5 cm (12.8 in). The body is uniformly pink, both dorsally and ventrally.

== Reproduction ==
The mode of reproduction of M. sphenorhynchus is unknown.
