= Kabinda worm lizard =

Scientific classification
- Kingdom: Animalia
- Phylum: Chordata
- Class: Reptilia
- Order: Squamata
- Clade: Amphisbaenia
- Family: Amphisbaenidae
- Genus: Monopeltis
- Species: M. kabindae

Binomial name
- Monopeltis kabindae de Witte & Laurent, 1942

Species of amphisbaenian

The Kabinda worm lizard (Monopeltis kabindae) is a species of amphisbaenian in the family Amphisbaenidae. The species is native to Central Africa.

== Geographic range ==
M. kabindae is found in the Central African Republic and the Democratic Republic of the Congo.

The type locality is Kabinda, Democratic Republic of the Congo.

== Description ==
The holotype of M. kabindae has a snout-to-vent length (SVL) of 188 mm (7.4 in).

== Reproduction ==
The mode of reproduction of M. kabindae is unknown.
