= Witte's worm lizard =

Scientific classification
- Kingdom: Animalia
- Phylum: Chordata
- Class: Reptilia
- Order: Squamata
- Clade: Amphisbaenia
- Family: Amphisbaenidae
- Genus: Monopeltis
- Species: M. remaclei

Binomial name
- Monopeltis remaclei de Witte, 1933

Species of amphisbaenian

Witte's worm lizard (Monopeltis remaclei) is a species of amphisbaenian in the family Amphisbaenidae. The species is endemic to the Democratic Republic of the Congo.

== Etymology ==
The specific name, remaclei, is in honor of David L. Remacle who collected the holotype.

== Reproduction ==
The mode of reproduction of M. remaclei is unknown.
