= Western Congo worm lizard =

Conservation status
- Least Concern (IUCN 3.1)

Scientific classification
- Kingdom: Animalia
- Phylum: Chordata
- Class: Reptilia
- Order: Squamata
- Clade: Amphisbaenia
- Family: Amphisbaenidae
- Genus: Monopeltis
- Species: M. guentheri

Binomial name
- Monopeltis guentheri Boulenger, 1885
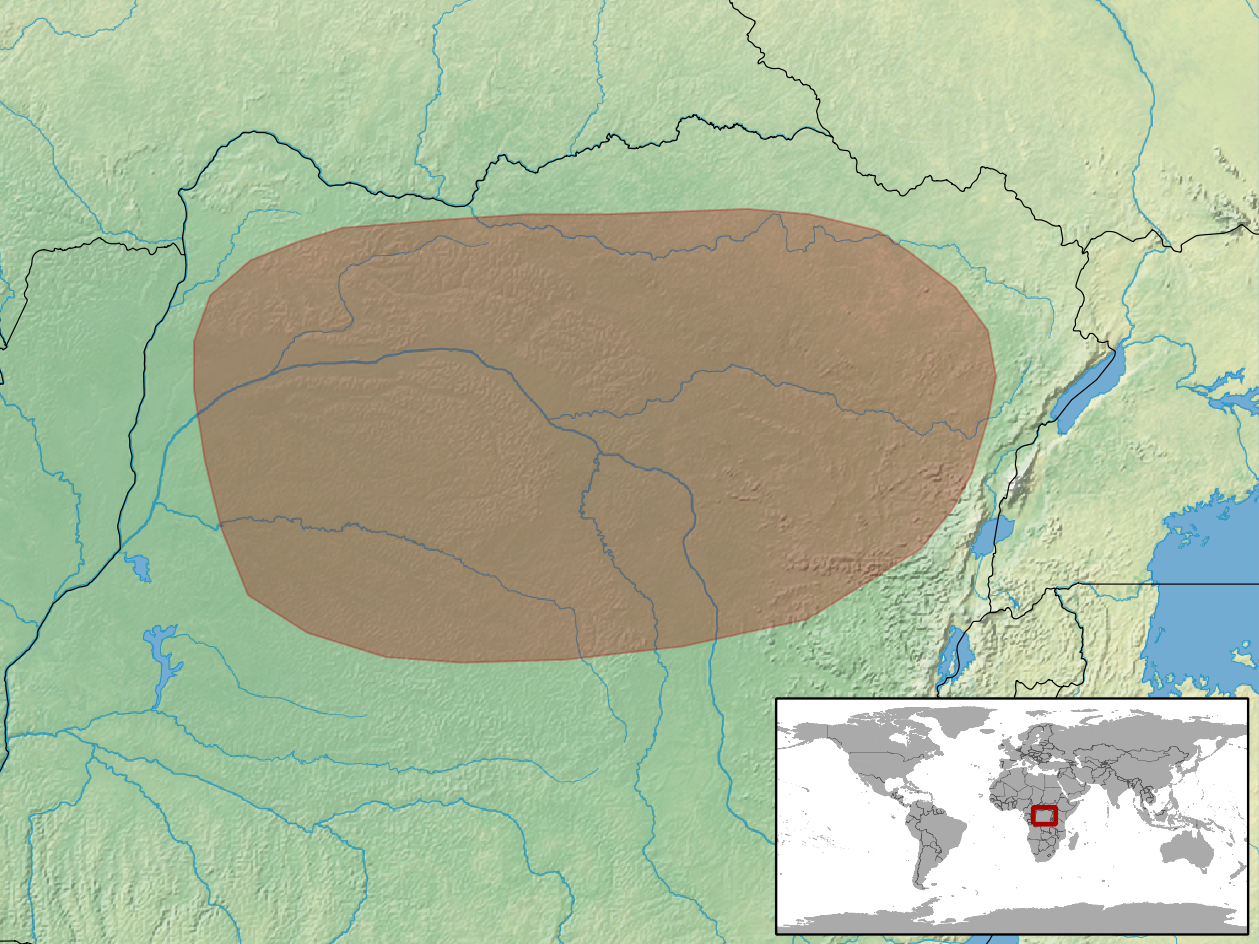

Synonyms
- Monopeltis guentheri Boulenger, 1885; Monopeltis boulengeri Boettger, 1887; Monopeltis güntheri — de Witte, 1954; Monopeltis guentheri — Broadley, 1998

Species of amphisbaenian

The Western Congo worm lizard (Monopeltis guentheri) is a species of amphisbaenian in the family Amphisbaenidae. The species is endemic to the Democratic Republic of the Congo.

== Etymology ==
The specific name, guentheri, is in honor of German-born British herpetologist Albert Günther.

== Geographic range ==
M. guentheri is found in the western part of the Democratic Republic of the Congo.

== Habitat ==
The preferred natural habitat of M. guentheri is forest.

== Description ==
M. guentheri may attain a snout-to-vent length (SVL) of 25 cm (9.8 in), with a tail length of 3 cm (1.2 in). It has 250–254 annuli on the body.

== Reproduction ==
The mode of reproduction of M. guentheri is unknown.
