= Vanderyst worm lizard =

Conservation status
- Least Concern (IUCN 3.1)

Scientific classification
- Kingdom: Animalia
- Phylum: Chordata
- Class: Reptilia
- Order: Squamata
- Clade: Amphisbaenia
- Family: Amphisbaenidae
- Genus: Monopeltis
- Species: M. vanderysti

Binomial name
- Monopeltis vanderysti de Witte, 1922

Synonyms
- Monopeltis vanderysti de Witte, 1922; Monopeltis lujae de Witte, 1922; Monopeltis vanderysti vilhenai Laurent, 1954; Monopeltis vanderysti closei Laurent, 1954; Monopeltis vanderysti — Broadley, Gans & Visser, 1976

Species of amphisbaenian

The Vanderyst worm lizard (Monopeltis vanderysti), also known commonly as Vanderyst's worm lizard, is a species of amphisbaenian in the family Amphisbaenidae. The species is native to Central Africa. There are two recognized subspecies.

== Etymology ==
The specific name, vanderysti, is in honor of Father Hyacinth Julien Robert Vanderyst (1860–1934), who was a missionary and naturalist in the Belgian Congo.

== Geographic range ==
M. vanderysti is found in Angola, and the Democratic Republic of the Congo.

== Habitat ==
The preferred natural habitat of M. vanderysti is savanna, but it has also been found in agricultural plantations.

== Behavior ==
M. vanderysti is terrestrial and fossorial.

== Subspecies ==
Two subspecies are recognized as being valid, including the nominotypical subspecies.

- Monopeltis vanderysti lujae de Witte, 1922
- Monopeltis vanderysti vanderysti de Witte, 1922

== Reproduction ==
The mode of reproduction of M. vanderysti is unknown.
