= Cyrtodactylus hitchi =

Scientific classification
- Kingdom: Animalia
- Phylum: Chordata
- Class: Reptilia
- Order: Squamata
- Suborder: Gekkota
- Family: Gekkonidae
- Genus: Cyrtodactylus
- Species: C. hitchi

Binomial name
- Cyrtodactylus hitchi Riyanto, Kurniati & Engilis, 2016

Species of gecko endemic to Indonesia

Cyrtodactylus hitchi is a species of gecko, a lizard in the family Gekkonidae. The species is endemic Indonesia.

== Etymology ==
The specific name, hitchi, is in honor of Alan Thomas Hitch.

== Geographic range ==
C. hitchi is found in Southeast Sulawesi province on the island of Sulawesi in Indonesia.

== Description ==
C. hitchi is a small species for its genus. Females may attain a snout-to-vent length (SVL) of 7.9 cm (3.1 in). Males are smaller, an example of sexual dimorphism, up to 7.0 cm (2.8 in) SVL.

== Reproduction ==
The mode of reproduction of C. hitchi is unknown.
