= Amblyodipsas rodhaini =

Conservation status
- Least Concern (IUCN 3.1)

Scientific classification
- Kingdom: Animalia
- Phylum: Chordata
- Class: Reptilia
- Order: Squamata
- Suborder: Serpentes
- Family: Atractaspididae
- Genus: Amblyodipsas
- Species: A. rodhaini

Binomial name
- Amblyodipsas rodhaini (de Witte, 1930)

Synonyms
- Rhinocalamus rhodaini [sic] de Witte, 1930; Calamelaps rodhaini — de Witte & Laurent, 1947; Amblyodipsas rodhaini — Welch, 1994

Species of snake

Amblyodipsas rodhaini, commonly known as Rodhain's purple-glossed snake, is a species of mildly venomous rear-fanged snake in the family Atractaspididae. The species is endemic to the Democratic Republic of the Congo.

== Etymology ==
Both the specific name, rodhaini, and the common name, Rodhain's purple-glossed snake, are in honor of Belgian physician and zoologist Jérome Alphonse Hubert Rodhain (1876–1956).

== Reproduction ==
A. rodhaini is oviparous.
