= Son's bent-toed gecko =

Conservation status
- Least Concern (IUCN 3.1)

Scientific classification
- Kingdom: Animalia
- Phylum: Chordata
- Class: Reptilia
- Order: Squamata
- Suborder: Gekkota
- Family: Gekkonidae
- Genus: Cyrtodactylus
- Species: C. soni

Binomial name
- Cyrtodactylus soni D.T. Le, T.Q. Nguyen, M.D. Le & Ziegler, 2016

Species of lizard

The Son's bent-toed gecko (Cyrtodactylus soni) is a species of lizard in the family Gekkonidae. This species is endemic to Vietnam.

== Etymology ==
The specific name, soni, is in honor of Vietnamese herpetologist Son Lan Hung Nguyen.

== Geographic range ==
C. soni is found in northern Vietnam, in Ninh Bình Province.

== Habitat ==
The preferred natural habitats of C. soni are forest and rocky areas, at altitudes of 17–28 m (56–92 ft).

== Description ==
Medium-sized for its genus, C. soni may attain a snout-to-vent length (SVL) of 10.3 cm (4.1 in).

== Reproduction ==
The mode of reproduction of C. soni is unknown.
