= Carved worm lizard =

Scientific classification
- Kingdom: Animalia
- Phylum: Chordata
- Class: Reptilia
- Order: Squamata
- Clade: Amphisbaenia
- Family: Amphisbaenidae
- Genus: Monopeltis
- Species: M. scalper

Binomial name
- Monopeltis scalper (Günther, 1876)

Synonyms
- Phractogonus scalper Günther, 1876; Lepidosternon scalprum — Strauch, 1881; Monopeltis scalper — Boulenger, 1885

Species of amphisbaenian

The carved worm lizard (Monopeltis scalper) is a species of amphisbaenian in the family Amphisbaenidae. The species is endemic to the Democratic Republic of the Congo. There are two recognized subspecies.

== Description ==
M. scalper is brownish dorsally, and it is whitish ventrally. It may attain a snout-to-vent length (SVL) of 29 cm (11 in), with a tail 2.9 cm (1.1 in) long.

== Reproduction ==
The mode of reproduction of M. scalper is unknown.

== Subspecies ==
Two subspecies are recognized as being valid, including the nominotypical subspecies.

- Monopeltis scalper gerardi Boulenger, 1913
- Monopeltis scalper scalper (Günther, 1876)

Nota bene: A trinomial authority in parentheses indicates that the subspecies was originally described in a genus other than Monopeltis.
