= Gaboon worm lizard =

Conservation status
- Least Concern (IUCN 3.1)

Scientific classification
- Kingdom: Animalia
- Phylum: Chordata
- Class: Reptilia
- Order: Squamata
- Clade: Amphisbaenia
- Family: Amphisbaenidae
- Genus: Monopeltis
- Species: M. jugularis

Binomial name
- Monopeltis jugularis W. Peters, 1880
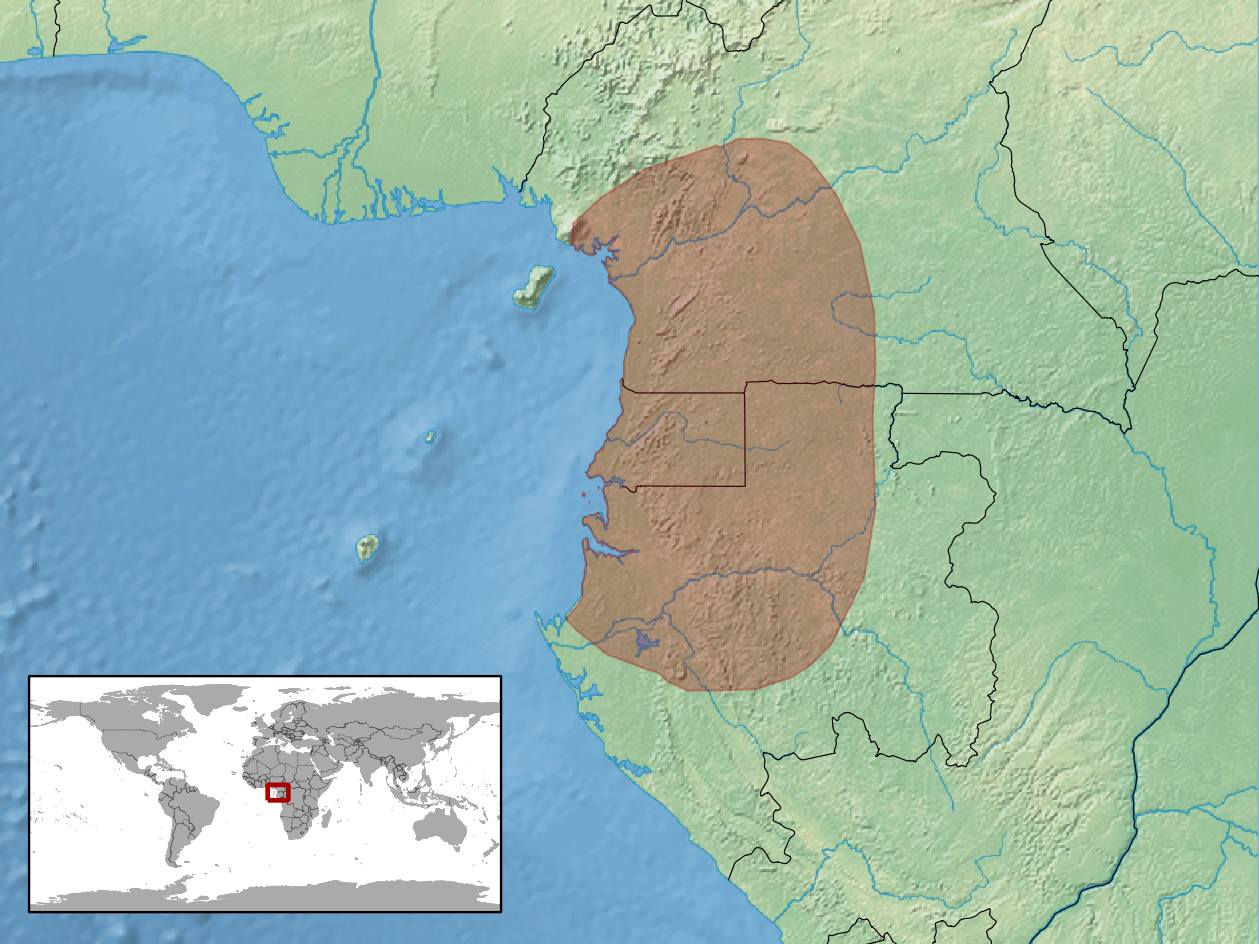

Synonyms
- Monopeltis (Phractogonus) jugularis W. Peters, 1880; Lepidosternon jugulare — Strauch, 1881; Lepidosternon koppenfelsii Strauch 1881; Monopeltis jugularis — Boulenger, 1885; Monopeltis semipunctata Boettger, 1893

Species of amphisbaenian

The Gaboon worm lizard (Monopeltis jugularis) is a species of amphisbaenian in the family Amphisbaenidae. The species is native to the west coast of Central Africa.

== Geographic range ==
M. jugularis is found in Cameroon, Equatorial Guinea, and Gabon.

== Habitat ==
The preferred natural habitat of M. jugularis is forest.

== Description ==
The holotype of M. jugularis has a total length of 51 cm (20 in), which includes a tail 2.9 cm (1.1 in) long. The body has a diameter of 2.2 cm (0.87 in).

== Reproduction ==
The mode of reproduction of M. jugularis is unknown.
