= Amblyodipsas teitana =

Conservation status
- Data Deficient (IUCN 3.1)

Scientific classification
- Kingdom: Animalia
- Phylum: Chordata
- Class: Reptilia
- Order: Squamata
- Suborder: Serpentes
- Family: Atractaspididae
- Genus: Amblyodipsas
- Species: A. teitana

Binomial name
- Amblyodipsas teitana Broadley, 1971

Species of snake

Amblyodipsas teitana, also known as the Taita Hills purple-glossed snake or Teitana purple-glossed snake, is a species of mildly venomous rear-fanged snake in the family Atractaspididae. It is endemic to the Taita Hills in Kenya, and only known from the holotype, a 43 cm (16.9 in) female, first identified as Calamelaps unicolor by Arthur Loveridge in 1936.
