= Kalahari worm lizard =

Scientific classification
- Kingdom: Animalia
- Phylum: Chordata
- Class: Reptilia
- Order: Squamata
- Clade: Amphisbaenia
- Family: Amphisbaenidae
- Genus: Monopeltis
- Species: M. leonhardi

Binomial name
- Monopeltis leonhardi F. Werner, 1910

Synonyms
- Monopeltis leonhardi F. Werner, 1910; Monopeltis vernayi V. FitzSimons, 1932; Monopeltis leonhardi — V. FitzSimons & Brain, 1958

Species of amphisbaenian

The Kalahari worm lizard (Monopeltis leonhardi), also known commonly as the Kalahari spade-snouted worm lizard, is a species of amphisbaenian in the family Amphisbaenidae. The species is indigenous to southern Africa.

== Etymology ==
The specific name, leonhardi, is in honor of German ethnographer Leonhard Schultze-Jena.

== Geographic range ==
M. leonhardi is found in Botswana, Namibia, South Africa and Zimbabwe.

== Habitat ==
The preferred natural habitat of M. leonhardi is shallow sand.

== Description ==
M. leonhardi is purplish pink dorsally, and pinkish ventrally. Adults usually have a snout-to-vent length (SVL) of 20–25 cm (7.9–9.8 in). The maximum recorded SVL is 29 cm (11 in).

== Reproduction ==
The mode of reproduction of M. leonhardi is unknown.
