= Monopeltis rhodesiana =

Scientific classification
- Kingdom: Animalia
- Phylum: Chordata
- Class: Reptilia
- Order: Squamata
- Clade: Amphisbaenia
- Family: Amphisbaenidae
- Genus: Monopeltis
- Species: M. rhodesiana

Binomial name
- Monopeltis rhodesiana Broadley, Gans & Visser, 1976

Synonyms
- Monopeltis capensis rhodesianus Broadley, Gans & Visser, 1976; Monopeltis rhodesianus — Broadley, 1988; Monopeltis rhodesiana — Broadley, 1997

Species of amphisbaenian

Monopeltis rhodesiana is a species of amphisbaenian in the family Amphisbaenidae. The species is native to southern Africa.

== Geographic range ==
M. rhodesiana is found in southern Malawi, central Mozambique, southern Zambia, and northwestern Zimbabwe.

== Habitat ==
The preferred natural habitat of M. rhodesiana is mesic savanna, with alluvial soil.

== Description ==
M. rhodesiana is pinkish, both dorsally and ventrally. Adults usually have a snout-to-vent length (SVL) of 20–25 cm (7.9–9.8 in). The maximimum recorded SVL is 28.5 cm (11.2 in). The tail is short, with only 5–9 caudal annuli.

== Reproduction ==
The mode of reproduction of M. rhodesiana is unknown.
