= Monopeltis galeata =

Scientific classification
- Kingdom: Animalia
- Phylum: Chordata
- Class: Reptilia
- Order: Squamata
- Clade: Amphisbaenia
- Family: Amphisbaenidae
- Genus: Monopeltis
- Species: M. galeata

Binomial name
- Monopeltis galeata (Hallowell, 1852)

Synonyms
- Phractogonus galeatus Hallowell, 1852; Monopeltis (Phractogonus) magnipartitus W. Peters, 1879; Lepidosternon galeatum — Strauch, 1881; Lepidosternon dumerilii Strauch, 1881; Monopeltis galeata — Boulenger, 1885; Monopeltis unirostralis Mocquard, 1903; Monopeltis boveei Mocquard, 1903

Species of amphisbaenian

Monopeltis galeata, the helmeted worm lizard, is a species of amphisbaenian in the family Amphisbaenidae. The species is native to the west coast of Central Africa.

== Geographic range ==
Monopeltis galeata is found in Cameroon, Equatorial Guinea (Corisco Island), and Gabon.

== Description ==
Monopeltis galeata may attain a snout-to-vent length of 46.5 cm (18.3 in), with a tail 3.5 cm (1.4 in) long. Specimens preserved in alcohol are whitish, both dorsally and ventrally.

== Reproduction ==
The mode of reproduction of M. galeata is unknown.
