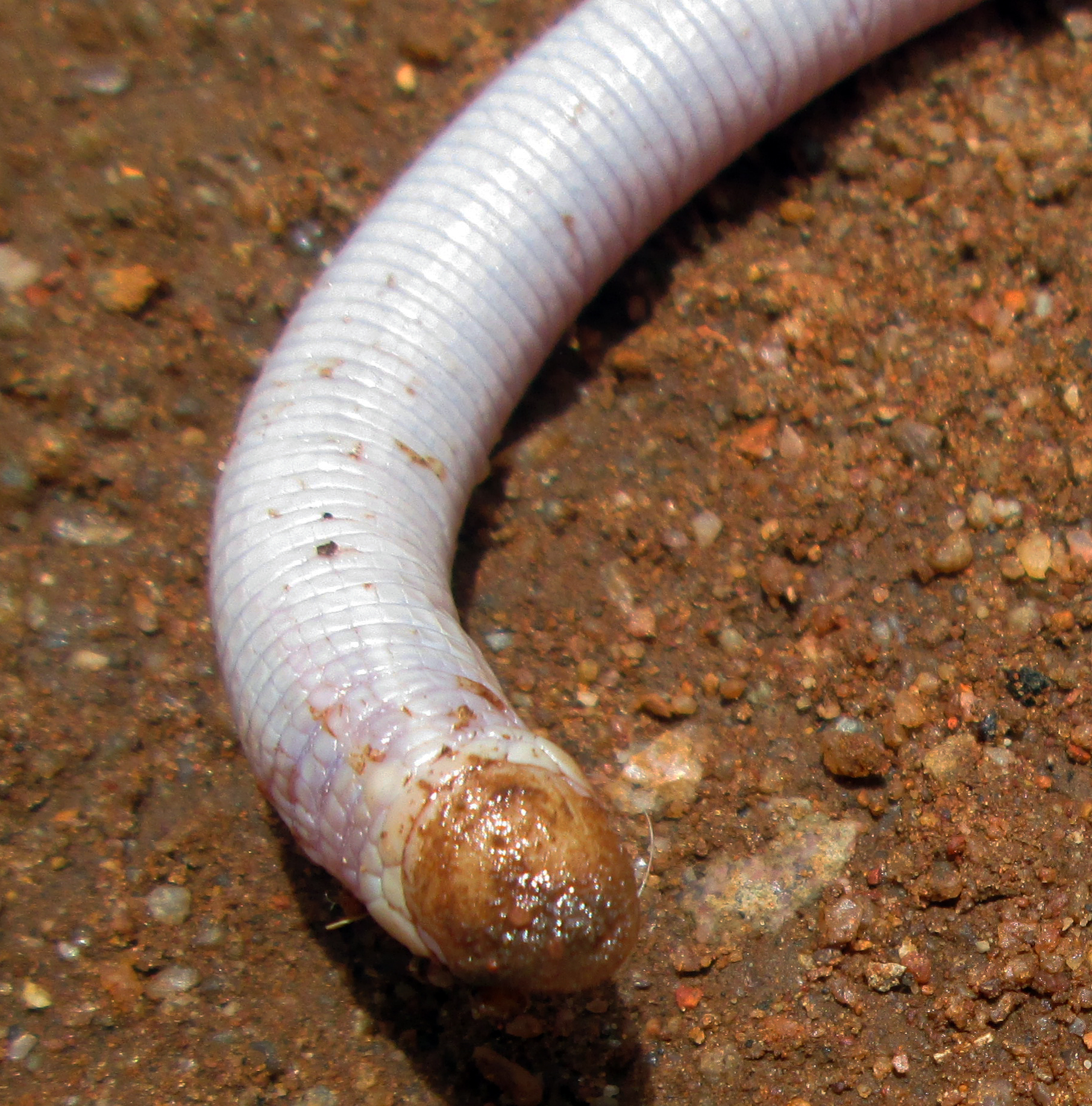

Conservation status
- Least Concern (IUCN 3.1)

Scientific classification
- Kingdom: Animalia
- Phylum: Chordata
- Class: Reptilia
- Order: Squamata
- Clade: Amphisbaenia
- Family: Amphisbaenidae
- Genus: Monopeltis
- Species: M. capensis

Binomial name
- Monopeltis capensis A. Smith, 1848

Synonyms
- Monopeltis capensis A. Smith, 1848; Monotrophis capensis — Gray, 1865 (ex errore); Lepidosternon capense — Strauch, 1881; Monopeltis capensis — Broadley, 1962

= Monopeltis capensis =

Species of amphisbaenian

Monopeltis capensis, also known commonly as the Cape spade-snouted worm lizard, the Cape wedge-snouted worm lizard, the Cape worm lizard, and the South African shield-snouted amphisbaenian, is a species of amphisbaenian in the family Amphisbaenidae. The species is native to southern Africa.

== Geographic range ==
M. capensis is found in Botswana, South Africa, and Zimbabwe.

== Habitat ==
The preferred natural habitats of M. capensis are grassland, shrubland, and savanna.

== Description ==
M. capensis is uniformly pinkish white, both dorsally and ventrally. Adults usually have a snout-to-vent length (SVL) of 20–30 cm (7.9–11.8 in). The maximum recorded SVL is 34 cm (13 in).

== Diet ==
M. capensis burrows in red soils to preys upon beetle larvae, termites, and other small invertebrates.

== Reproduction ==
M. capensis is viviparous. A brood of 1–3 is born in summer. Each neonate has a total length (including tail) of 9–10 cm (3.5–3.9 in).
