= Monopeltis mauricei =

Conservation status
- Least Concern (IUCN 3.1)

Scientific classification
- Kingdom: Animalia
- Phylum: Chordata
- Class: Reptilia
- Order: Squamata
- Clade: Amphisbaenia
- Family: Amphisbaenidae
- Genus: Monopeltis
- Species: M. mauricei

Binomial name
- Monopeltis mauricei Parker, 1935

Species of amphisbaenian

Monopeltis mauricei, Maurice's slender worm lizard or Maurice's spade-snouted worm lizard, is a species of amphisbaenian in the family Amphisbaenidae. The species found in Botswana, Namibia, South Africa, Zambia, and Zimbabwe.
