= De Coster's worm lizard =

Scientific classification
- Kingdom: Animalia
- Phylum: Chordata
- Class: Reptilia
- Order: Squamata
- Clade: Amphisbaenia
- Family: Amphisbaenidae
- Genus: Monopeltis
- Species: M. decosteri

Binomial name
- Monopeltis decosteri Boulenger, 1910

Species of amphisbaenian

De Coster's worm lizard (Monopeltis decosteri), also known commonly as De Coster's spade-snouted worm lizard and De Coster's worm-lizard, is a species of amphisbaenian in the family Amphisbaenidae. The species is indigenous to southern Africa.

== Etymology ==
The specific name, decosteri, is in honor of Belgian Consul Juste De Coster, who was stationed at Delagoa Bay, Mozambique.

== Geographic range ==
M. decosteri is found in Mozambique, South Africa, and Zimbabwe.

== Habitat ==
The preferred natural habitat of M. decosteri is moist savanna with sandy soil.

== Description ==
In life M. decosteri is pinkish white dorsally and ventrally. Preserved specimens in alcohol are yellowish white. Adults usually have a snout-to-vent length (SVL) of 20–25 cm (7.9–9.8 in), but the maximum recorded SVL is 29 cm (11 in).

== Reproduction ==
M. decosteri is viviparous.
