= Henri Schouteden =

Belgian zoologist, ornithologist and entomologist

Henri Schouteden (9 July 1881 in Brussels – 15 November 1972 in Brussels) was a Belgian zoologist, ornithologist and entomologist who undertook numerous expeditions into the Congo, Rwanda, and Burundi.

== Works ==
(All in French)

- Schouteden, H. (1912). "Rhopaloceres recuillis dans l’Uelle par M.Castelain". Annales de la Société Entomologique de Belgique. 55: 362–364.
- Schouteden, H. (1912). "Rhopaloceres recuillis dans le Haut-Ituri par le Dr Bayer". Revue de Zoologie Africaine. 1: 389–396.
- Schouteden, H. (1919). "La faune des Acraides du Congo Belge". Revue de Zoologie Africaine. 6: 145–162.
- Schouteden, H. (1926). "Contribution a l’etude des Lepidopteres Rhopaloceres du Katanga (collections Overlaet, etc.)". Revue de Zoologie Africaine. 14: 217–236.
- Schouteden, H. (1927). "Contribution a l’etude des Lepidopteres Rhopaloceres du Katanga (collections Overlaet, etc.). 2me partie. Nymphalidae et Acraeidae". Revue de Zoologie Africaine. 14: 283–309.
- Schouteden, H. (1934). "Charaxes Overlaeti nov. sp". Revue de Zoologie et de Botanique Africaine. 26: 122–124.

== Species named in honor of Schouteden ==
Species named for Schouteden include a worm lizard Monopeltis schoutedeni, a chameleon Trioceros schoutedeni, a snake Helophis schoutedeni, a shrew Paracrocidura schoutedeni, a butterfly Bebearia schoutedeni, a testate amoeba Hyalosphenia schoutedeni, a pufferfish Tetraodon schoutedeni, among many others. His collection of butterflies from the Belgian Congo is held by the Royal Museum for Central Africa.

- Petrocephalus schoutedeni, is a species of electric fish in the family Mormyridae, found the coastal basins between Sierra Leone and Côte d'Ivoire, part of the Sassandra River. it is also known from the Niandan River, which is an affluent of the Niger River in Guinea and also from the upper Cavally River in Liberia, Guinea and Ghana.

== Sources ==
- Osborn, H. (1952). A Brief History of Entomology Including Time of Demosthenes and Aristotle to Modern Times with over Five Hundred Portraits. Columbus, Ohio: The Spahr & Glenn Company. 303 pp.
