= Tangled nature model =

The tangled nature model is a model of evolutionary ecology developed by Christensen, Di Collobiano, Hall and Jensen. It is an agent-based model where individual 'organisms' interact, reproduce, mutate and die across many generations. A notable feature of the model is punctuated equilibrium, abrupt and spontaneous transitions between long lived stable states. In addition to evolutionary ecology the model has been used to study sustainability, organizational ecology, the Gaia hypothesis opinion dynamics and cultural evolution among other topics.

== Model Description ==
Individuals in the model are represented by binary 'genomes' $a$ of some fixed length $L$. All individuals with the same genome are equivalent and combine into 'species' with populations $N_a$ where $N = \sum_a^D N_a$ is the total population and $D$ the number of distinct species.

The individuals interact through a coupling matrix $J$. Typically some fraction of the potential entries are set to zero, as well as the diagonals $J_{aa} = 0$ and for the non-zero elements $J_{ab} \neq J_{ba}$.

In a single update step an individual is selected and reproduces with probability $p_{off}(H_a)$ and dies with probability $p_d$ which is usually constant.

$$p_{off}(H_a) = \frac{e^{H_a}}{1 + e^{H_a}}$$

which is a sigmoid function of the fitness

$$H_a = -\mu N + \frac{1}{N}\sum_b J_{ab} N_b$$

This compares the interaction of every individual with every other individual as specified by the coupling matrix $J$. $\mu$ is the inverse of the carrying capacity and controls the total number of individuals which can exist in the model. When an individual reproduces asexually there is some small, fixed probability $p_{mut}$ for each 'bit' in the genome to flip and thereby generate a new species.

Typically $\frac{N}{p_d}$ chances for reproduction and death are taken to constitute one generation and the model is run for many thousands of generations.

== Model Dynamics ==
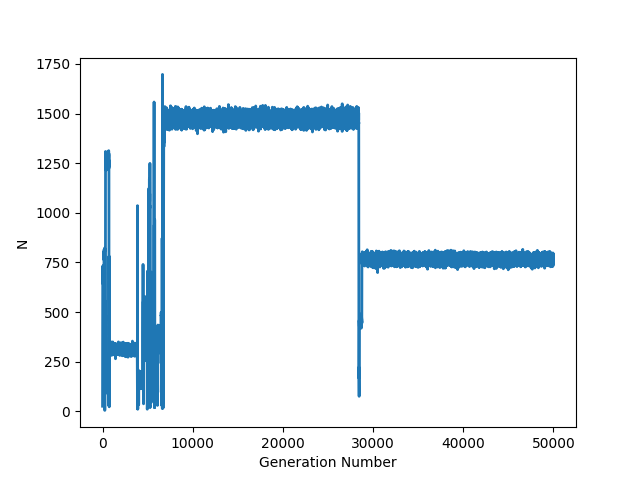
Population $N$ in the Tangled Nature Model over the course of 50000 generations. There are three stable states with relatively rapid transitions between them.

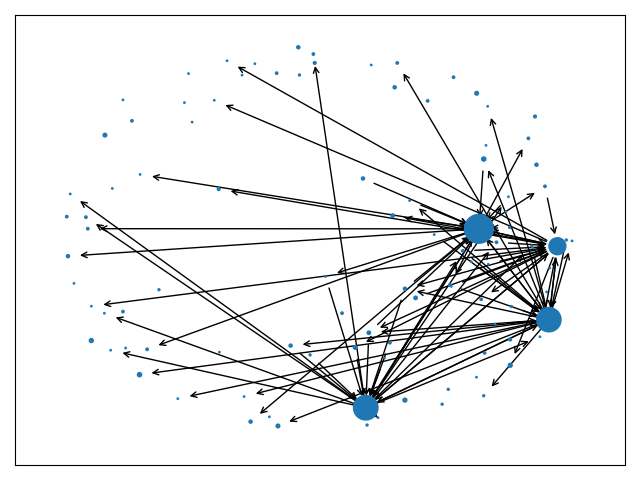
Tangled nature model state after 10000 generations. There are 4 populous species (core) and many small species (cloud) with strong interactions only between core species.

Plotting the model population over time demonstrates punctuated equilibrium, long lived quasi stable states which abruptly terminate and are replaced with new ones. During a stable period the model generates a network of mutualistic interactions between a small number of populous species, often called the 'core' and 'cloud'

In a stable period a core species has $p_{off}(H_a) \simeq p_d$. For a new species $c$ to arise and gain significant population requires $p_{off}(H_c) > p_d$. Solving for $H_c$ gives

$$\sum_b J_{cb} \frac{N_b}{N} > \mu N -\log( 1/p_d - 1 )$$

as the requirement for the new species to be viable. This means the new species has to have sufficiently strong net positive interactions, especially with the core species, which are the only ones with large values of $\frac{N_b}{N}$. The right hand side represents a 'barrier', controlled by the total population, which makes large population states harder to invade.

If a new species can overcome the barrier then it will grow rapidly, at the expense of the existing species either through parasitic couplings $J_{cb} < 0$ or by using up the carrying capacity of the system. This can precipitate either a core rearrangement, with the incorporation of the new species into the core and a readjustment of populations, or a total collapse of the state.

== See also ==
- Evolutionary ecology
- NK model
