= Evolutionary ecology =

Interaction of biology and evolution

Evolutionary ecology is a science at the intersection of ecology and evolutionary biology. It approaches the study of ecology in a way that explicitly considers the evolutionary histories of species and the interactions between them. Conversely, it can be seen as an approach to the study of evolution that incorporates an understanding of the interactions between the species under consideration. The main subfields of evolutionary ecology are life history evolution, sociobiology (the evolution of social behavior), the evolution of interspecific interactions (e.g. cooperation, predator–prey interactions, parasitism, mutualism) and the evolution of biodiversity and of ecological communities.

Evolutionary ecology mostly considers two things: how interactions (both among species and between species and their physical environment) shape species through selection and adaptation, and the consequences of the resulting evolutionary change.

== Evolutionary models ==
A large part of evolutionary ecology is about utilising models and finding empirical data as proof. Examples include the Lack clutch size model devised by David Lack and his study of Darwin's finches on the Galapagos Islands. Lack's study of Darwin's finches was important in analyzing the role of different ecological factors in speciation. Lack suggested that differences in species were adaptive and produced by natural selection, based on the assertion by G.F. Gause that two species cannot occupy the same niche.

Richard Levins introduced his model of the specialization of species in 1968, which investigated how habitat specialization evolved within heterogeneous environments using the fitness sets an organism or species possesses. This model developed the concept of spatial scales in specific environments, defining fine-grained spatial scales and coarse-grained spatial scales. The implications of this model include a rapid increase in environmental ecologists' understanding of how spatial scales impact species diversity in a certain environment.

Another model is Law and Diekmann's 1996 models on mutualism, which is defined as a relationship between two organisms that benefits both individuals. Law and Diekmann developed a framework called adaptive dynamics, which assumes that changes in plant or animal populations in response to a disturbance or lack thereof occurs at a faster rate than mutations occur. It is aimed to simplify other models addressing the relationships within communities.

The tangled nature model provides different methods for demonstrating and predicting trends in evolutionary ecology. The model analyzes an individual prone to mutation within a population as well as other factors such as extinction rate. The model was developed by Simon Laird, Daniel Lawson, and Henrik Jeldtoft Jensen of the Imperial College London in 2002. The purpose of the model is to create a simple and logical ecological model based on observation. The model is designed such that ecological effects can be accounted for when determining form, and fitness of a population.

== Ecological genetics ==
Ecological genetics tie into evolutionary ecology through the study of how traits evolve in natural populations. Ecologists are concerned with how the environment and timeframe leads to genes becoming dominant. Organisms must continually adapt in order to survive in natural habitats. Genes define which organisms survive and which will die out. When organisms develop different genetic variations, even though they stem from the same species, it is known as polymorphism. Organisms that pass on beneficial genes continue to evolve their species to have an advantage inside of their niche.

== Research ==
Michael Rosenzweig's idea of reconciliation ecology was developed based on existing research, which was conducted on the principle first suggested by Alexander von Humboldt stating that larger areas of land will have increased species diversity as compared to smaller areas. This research focused on species-area relationships (SPARs) and the different scales on which they exist, ranging from sample-area to interprovincial SPARs. Steady-state dynamics in diversity gave rise to these SPARs, which are now used to measure the reduction of species diversity on Earth. In response to this decline in diversity, Rosenzweig's reconciliation ecology was born.

Evolutionary ecology has been studied using symbiotic relationships between organisms to determine the evolutionary forces by which such relationships develop. In symbiotic relationships, the symbiont must confer some advantage to its host in order to persist and continue to be evolutionarily viable. Research has been conducted using aphids and the symbiotic bacteria with which they coevolve. These bacteria are most frequently conserved from generation to generation, displaying high levels of vertical transmission. Results have shown that these symbiotic bacteria ultimately confer some resistance to parasites to their host aphids, which both increases the fitness of the aphids and lead to symbiont-mediated coevolution between the species.

== Evolutionary ecologists ==
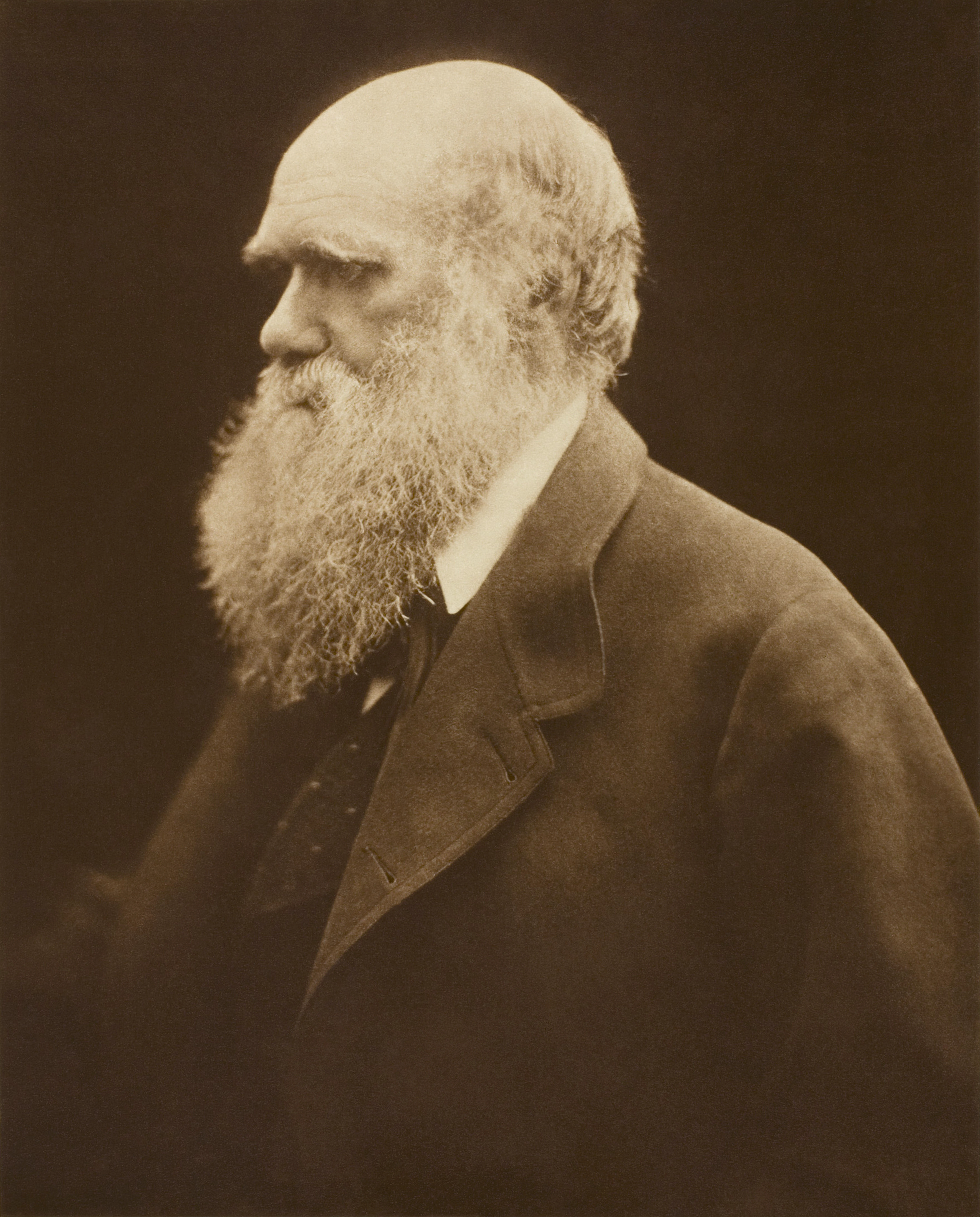
Julia Margaret Cameron's portrait of Darwin

=== Charles Darwin ===
The basis of the central principles of evolutionary ecology can be attributed to Charles Darwin (1809–1882), specifically in referencing his theory of natural selection and population dynamics, which discusses how populations of a species change over time. According to Ernst Mayr, professor of zoology at Harvard University, Darwin's most distinct contributions to evolutionary biology and ecology are as follows: "The first is the non-constancy of species, or the modern conception of evolution itself. The second is the notion of branching evolution, implying the common descent of all species of living things on earth from a single unique origin." Additionally, "Darwin further noted that evolution must be gradual, with no major breaks or discontinuities. Finally, he reasoned that the mechanism of evolution was natural selection."

=== George Evelyn Hutchinson ===
George Evelyn Hutchinson's (1903–1991) contributions to the field of ecology spanned over 60 years, in which he had significant influence in systems ecology, radiation ecology, limnology, and entomology. Described as the "father of modern ecology" by Stephen Jay Gould, Hutchinson was one of the first scientists to link the subjects of ecology and mathematics. According to Hutchinson, he constructed "mathematical models of populations, the changing proportions of individuals of various ages, birthrate, the ecological niche, and population interaction in this technical introduction to population ecology." He also had a vast interest in limnology, due to his belief that lakes could be studied as a microcosm that provides insight into system behavior. Hutchinson is also known for his work Circular Causal Systems in Ecology, in which he states that "groups of organisms may be acted upon by their environment, and they may react upon it. If a set of properties in either system changes in such a way that the action of the first system on the second changes, this may cause changes in properties of the second system which alter the mode of action of the second system on the first."

=== Robert MacArthur ===
Robert MacArthur (1930–1972) is best known in the field of Evolutionary Ecology for his work The Theory of Island Biogeography, in which he and his co-author propose "that the number of species on any island reflects a balance between the rate at which new species colonize it and the rate at which populations of established species become extinct."

=== Eric Pianka ===
According to the University of Texas, Eric Pianka's (1939–2022) work in evolutionary ecology includes foraging strategies, reproductive tactics, competition and niche theory, community structure and organization, species diversity, and understanding rarity. Pianka is also known for his interest in lizards to study ecological occurrences, as he claimed they were "often abundant, making them relatively easy to locate, observe, and capture."

=== Michael Rosenzweig ===
Michael L. Rosenzweig (1941–present) created and popularized Reconciliation ecology, which began with his theory that designated nature preserves would not be enough land to conserve the biodiversity of Earth, as humans have used so much land that they have negatively impacted biogeochemical cycles and had other ecological impacts that have negatively affected species compositions.

=== Other ===
- R. A. Fisher (1890–1962), whose 1930 fundamental theorem of natural selection recognised the power of rigorous application of the theory of natural selection to population biology.
- David Lack (1910–1973), a follower of Charles Darwin, worked to merge the fields of evolutionary biology and ecology, focusing mainly on birds and evolution.
- Thierry Lodé (1956–present), a French ecologist whose work focused on how sexual conflict in populations of species impacts evolution.

== See also ==
- Evolutionary Ecology (journal)
