= Monopeltis =

Scientific classification
- Kingdom: Animalia
- Phylum: Chordata
- Class: Reptilia
- Order: Squamata
- Clade: Amphisbaenia
- Family: Amphisbaenidae
- Genus: Monopeltis; A. Smith, 1848

Species
- 20, see text.

Genus of amphisbaenians

Monopeltis is a genus of amphisbaenians in the family Amphisbaenidae. Species in the genus are commonly known as worm lizards, even though they are not lizards. The genus is endemic to southern Africa. 20 species are placed in this genus.

== Species ==
The following species are recognized as being valid.

- Monopeltis adercae de Witte, 1953 – Lualaba worm lizard
- Monopeltis anchietae (Bocage, 1873) – Angolan spade-snouted worm lizard, Anchieta's worm lizard
- Monopeltis capensis A. Smith, 1848 – Cape worm lizard, South African shield-snouted amphisbaenian, Cape wedge-snouted worm lizard
- Monopeltis decosteri Boulenger, 1910 – De Coster's worm lizard
- Monopeltis galeata (Hallowell, 1852) – helmeted worm lizard
- Monopeltis guentheri Boulenger, 1885 – Western Congo worm lizard
- Monopeltis infuscata Broadley, 1997 – dusky spade-snouted worm lizard, infuscate wedge-snouted amphisbaenian
- Monopeltis jugularis W. Peters, 1880 – Gaboon worm lizard
- Monopeltis kabindae de Witte & Laurent, 1942 – Kabinda worm lizard
- Monopeltis leonhardi F. Werner, 1910 – Kalahari worm lizard
- Monopeltis luandae Gans, 1976
- Monopeltis mauricei Parker, 1935 – Maurice's slender worm lizard, Maurice's spade-snouted worm lizard
- Monopeltis perplexus Gans, 1976
- Monopeltis remaclei de Witte, 1933 – Witte's worm lizard
- Monopeltis rhodesiana Broadley, Gans & Visser, 1976
- Monopeltis scalper (Günther, 1876) – carved worm lizard
- Monopeltis schoutedeni de Witte, 1933 – Middle Congo worm lizard
- Monopeltis sphenorhynchus (W. Peters, 1879) – slender spade-snouted worm lizard, Maurice's spade-snouted worm lizard
- Monopeltis vanderysti de Witte, 1922 – Vanderyst worm lizard
- Monopeltis zambezensis Gans & Broadley, 1974

Nota bene: A binomial authority in parentheses indicates that the species was originally described in a genus other than Monopeltis.
