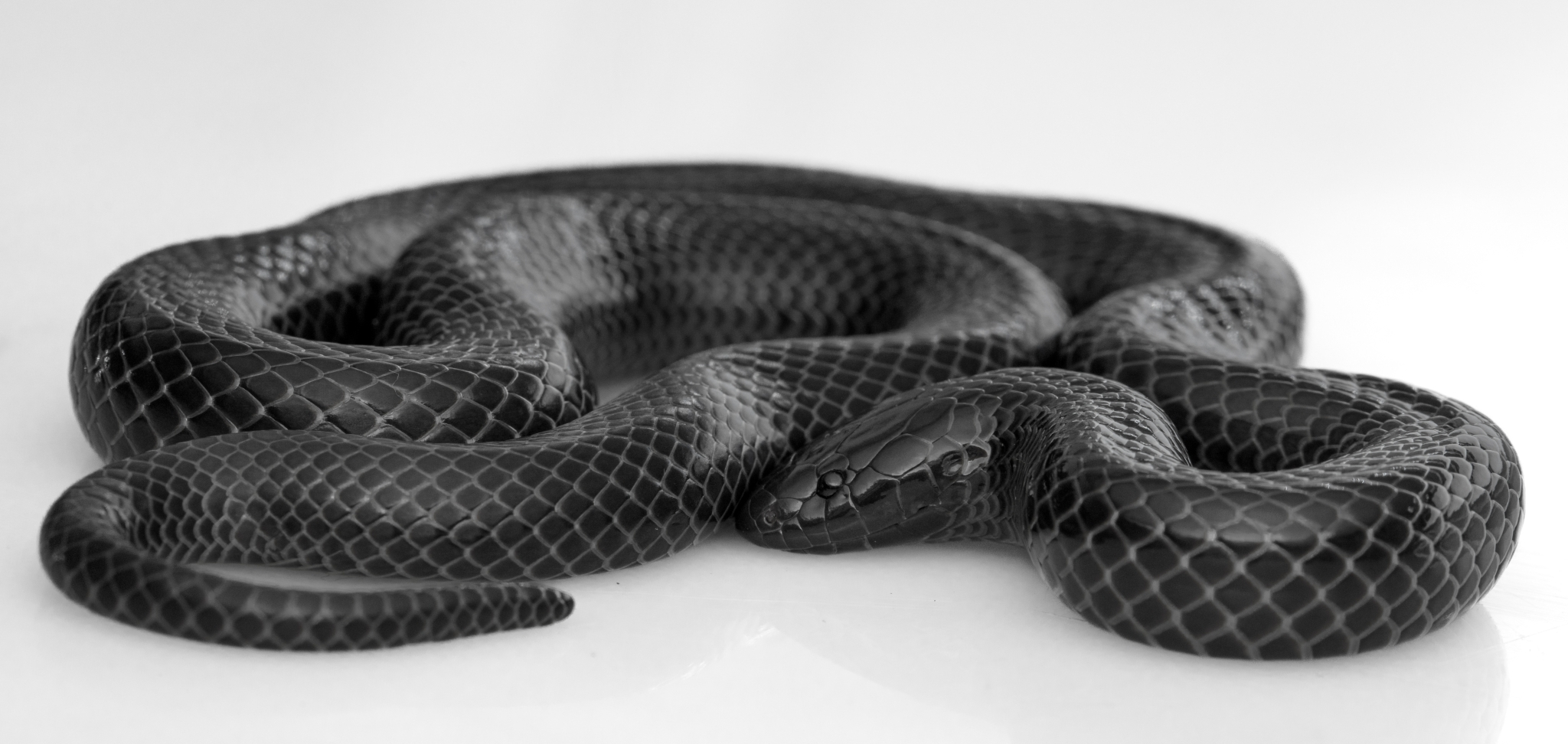

Conservation status
- Least Concern (IUCN 3.1)

Scientific classification
- Kingdom: Animalia
- Phylum: Chordata
- Class: Reptilia
- Order: Squamata
- Suborder: Serpentes
- Family: Atractaspididae
- Genus: Amblyodipsas
- Species: A. concolor

Binomial name
- Amblyodipsas concolor (A. Smith, 1849)

Synonyms
- Choristodon (Choristocalamus) concolor A. Smith, 1849; Calamelaps ? [sic] concolor – Boulenger, 1896; Amblyodipsas concolor – Boycott, 1992

= Amblyodipsas concolor =

Species of snake

Amblyodipsas concolor, also known as the KwaZulu-Natal purple-glossed snake or Natal purple-glossed snake, is a species of mildly venomous rear-fanged snake in the Atractaspididae family.

== Geographic range ==
It is endemic to Southern Africa. More specifically it is found in the northeastern and eastern parts of the Republic of South Africa and in Eswatini. Its range probably extends into southern Mozambique.

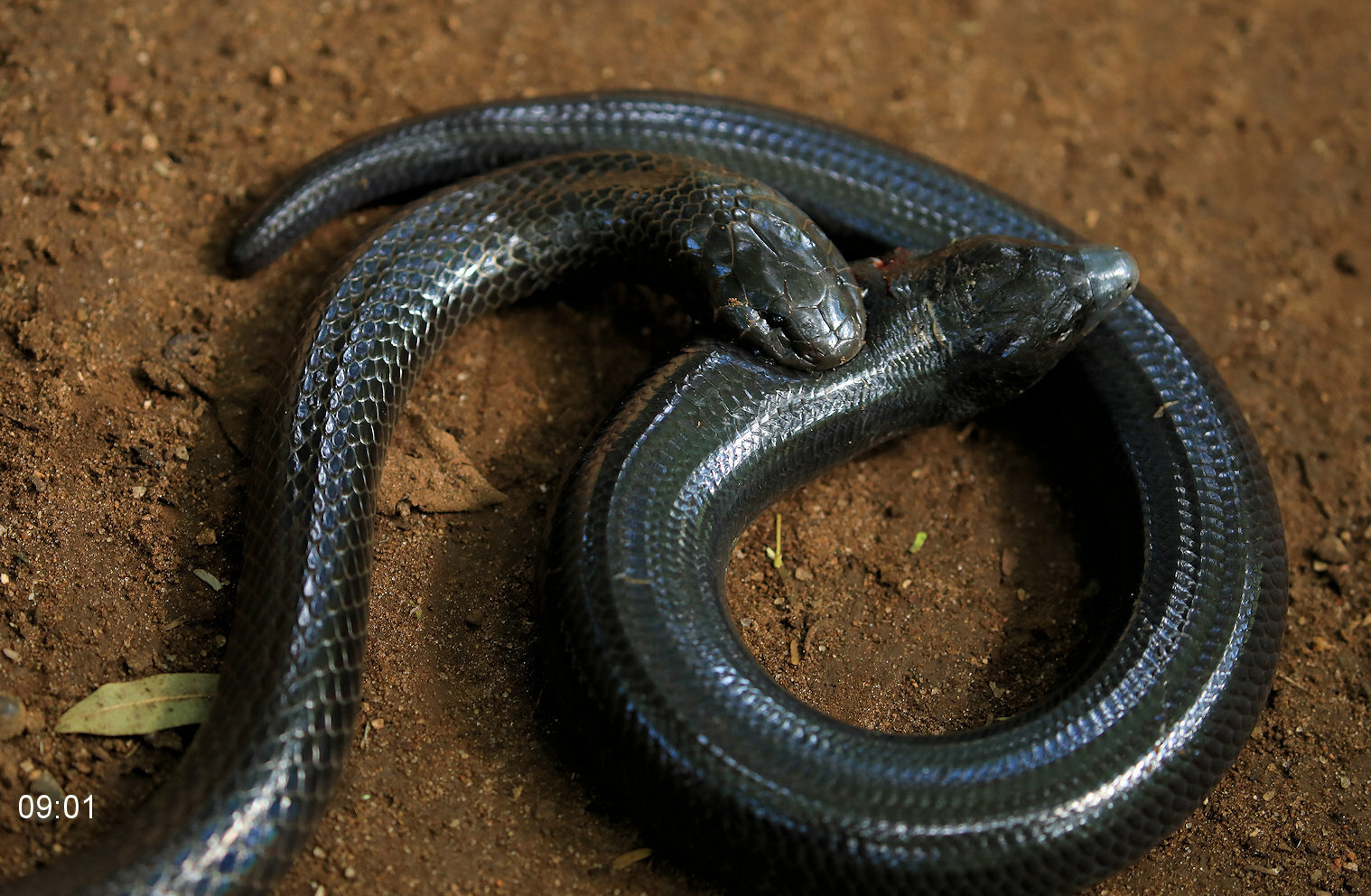
Eating a giant legless skink

== Description ==
Dorsally dark brown or purple-black, with purple gloss. Ventrally pale blackish purple, the ventrals margined behind with livid white. Dorsal scales in 17 rows. Ventrals 133–157; subcaudals 28–39. Total length 19 cm (7 1/2 in); tail 28 mm (1 1/8 in).
