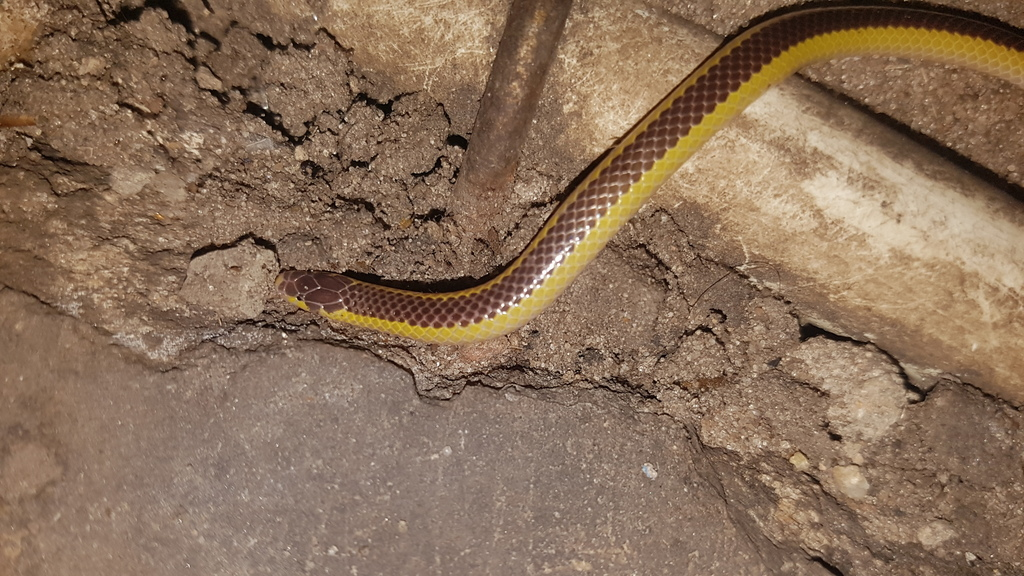

Conservation status
- Least Concern (IUCN 3.1)

Scientific classification
- Kingdom: Animalia
- Phylum: Chordata
- Class: Reptilia
- Order: Squamata
- Suborder: Serpentes
- Family: Atractaspididae
- Genus: Amblyodipsas
- Species: A. ventrimaculata

Binomial name
- Amblyodipsas ventrimaculata (Roux, 1907)

Synonyms
- Rhinocalamus ventrimaculatus Roux, 1907

= Amblyodipsas ventrimaculata =

Species of snake

Amblyodipsas ventrimaculata, or the Kalahari purple-glossed snake, is a species of mildly venomous rear-fanged snake in the Atractaspididae family. It is endemic to Namibia, Botswana, northern Zimbabwe, and western Zambia.
