= Monopeltis luandae =

Conservation status
- Least Concern (IUCN 3.1)

Scientific classification
- Kingdom: Animalia
- Phylum: Chordata
- Class: Reptilia
- Order: Squamata
- Clade: Amphisbaenia
- Family: Amphisbaenidae
- Genus: Monopeltis
- Species: M. luandae

Binomial name
- Monopeltis luandae Gans, 1976

Species of amphisbaenian

Monopeltis luandae is a species of amphisbaenian in the family Amphisbaenidae. The species is endemic to Angola.

== Habitat ==
The preferred natural habitat of M. luandae is savanna, at altitudes of 20–150 m (66–492 ft).

== Description ==
M. luandae may attain a snout-to-vent length (SVL) of 38.5 cm (15.2 in). Dorsally, it is speckled with dark pigment.

== Reproduction ==
The mode of reproduction of M. luandae is unknown.
