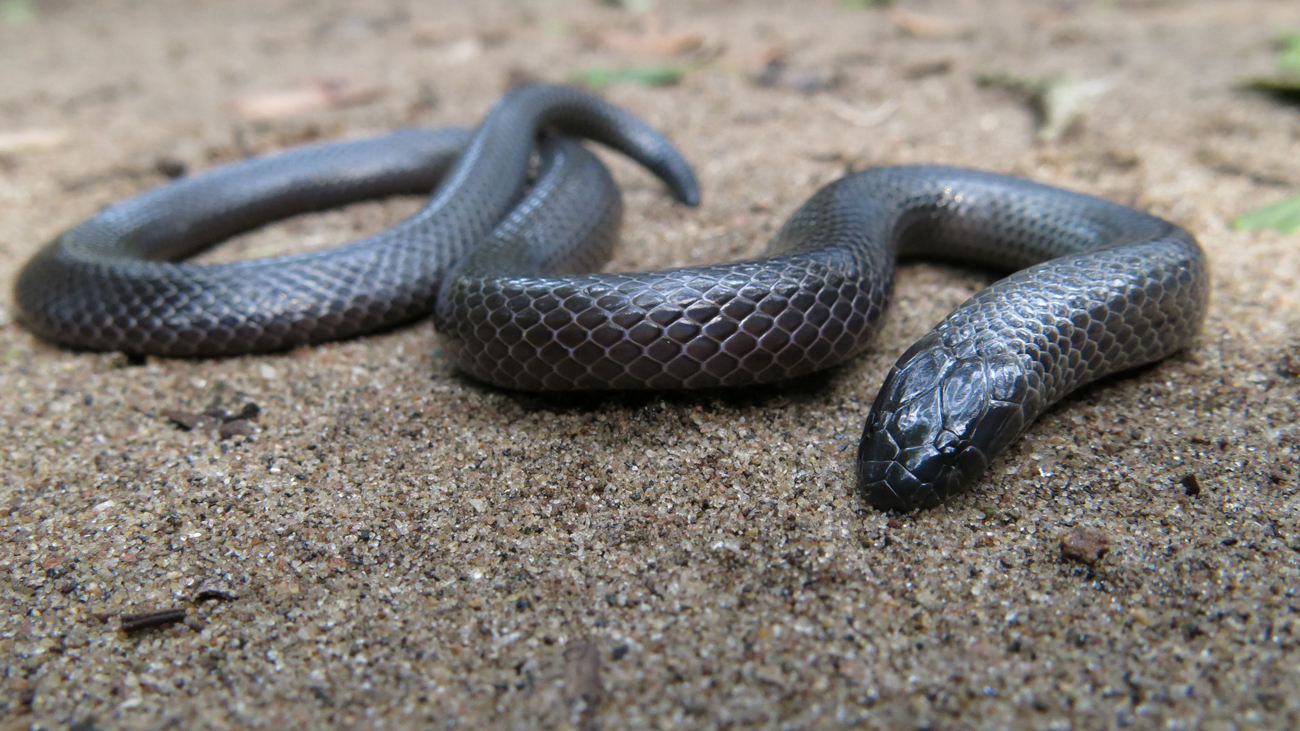
- Amblyodipsas polylepis

Scientific classification
- Domain: Eukaryota
- Kingdom: Animalia
- Phylum: Chordata
- Class: Reptilia
- Order: Squamata
- Suborder: Serpentes
- Family: Atractaspididae
- Subfamily: Aparallactinae
- Genus: Amblyodipsas; W. Peters, 1857

= Amblyodipsas =

Genus of snakes

Amblyodipsas is a genus of snakes found in Africa. Currently, 9 species are recognized. These snakes are often known as purple-glossed snakes or glossy snakes. Although rear-fanged, all species are considered harmless, but their venom has not been well studied. They should not be confused with the glossy snakes of the genus Arizona, which are found in North America.

== Description ==
Maxillary very short, with five teeth gradually increasing in size and followed, after an interspace, by a large grooved fang situated below the eye. Mandibular teeth decreasing in size posteriorly. Head small, not distinct from neck; eye minute, with round pupil; nostril in a single very small nasal; no internasals; no loreal; no preocular; no anterior temporal. Body cylindrical. Dorsal scales smooth, without pits. Tail very short, obtuse. Subcaudals in two rows.

== Species ==
Genus Amblyodipsas -- 10 species
Species	Taxon author	Subspecies*	Common name	Geographic range
A. concolor	(A. Smith, 1849)	————	Natal purple-glossed snake	Republic of South Africa, Eswatini.
A. dimidiata	(Günther, 1888)	————	Mpwapwa purple-glossed snake	North Tanzania.
A. katangensis	de Witte & Laurent, 1942	ionidesi	Katanga purple-glossed snake	Democratic Republic of the Congo, Zambia.
A. microphthalma^{T}	(Bianconi, 1852)	————	eastern purple-glossed snake	Mozambique, Republic of South Africa.
A. polylepis	(Bocage, 1873)	hildebrandtii	common purple-glossed snake	Angola, Namibia, Botswana, Democratic Republic of the Congo, Zambia, Mozambique, Zimbabwe, Malawi, Republic of South Africa, Tanzania, coastal Kenya, Somalia.
A. rodhaini	(de Witte, 1930)	————	Rodhain's purple-glossed snake	Democratic Republic of the Congo.
A. teitana	Broadley, 1971	————	Teitana purple-glossed snake	Kenya
A. unicolor	(J.T. Reinhardt, 1843)	————	western purple-glossed snake	Central African Republic, Uganda, Kenya, Tanzania, Ivory Coast, Democratic Republic of the Congo, Gambia, Senegal, Guinea-Bissau, Guinea, Burkina Faso, Niger, Chad.
A. ventrimaculata	(Roux, 1907)	————	Kalahari purple-glossed snake	Namibia, Botswana, Zimbabwe, Zambia.

*) Not including the nominate subspecies. ^{T}) Type species.

== See also ==
- Snakebite
