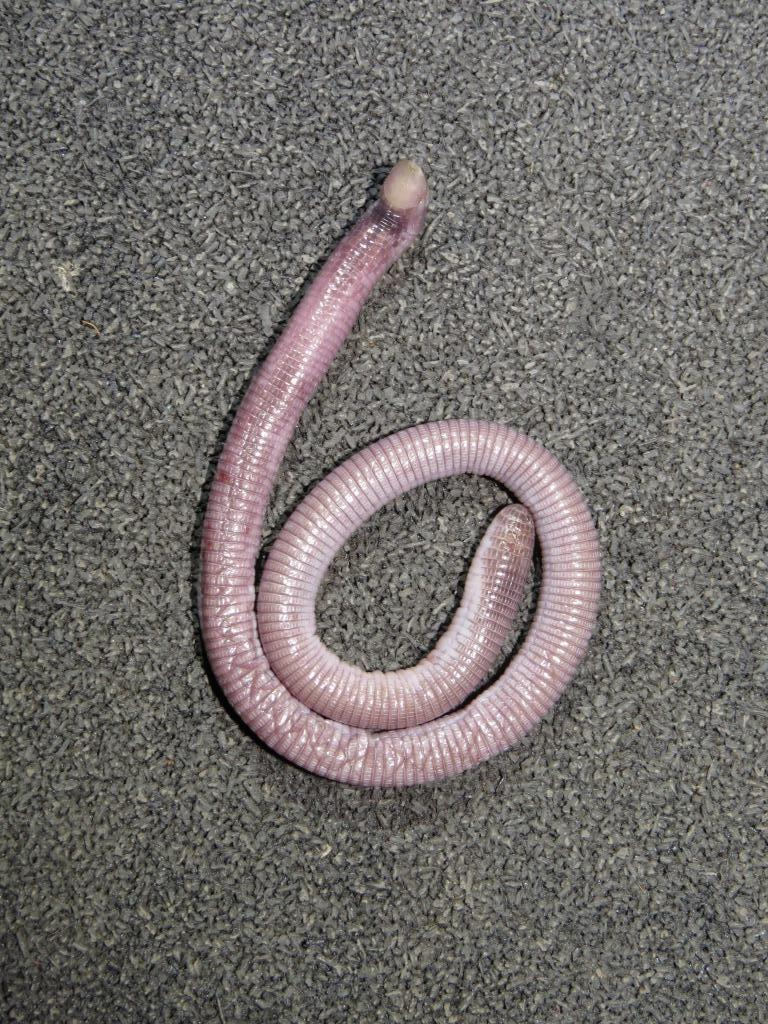

Conservation status
- Least Concern (IUCN 3.1)

Scientific classification
- Kingdom: Animalia
- Phylum: Chordata
- Class: Reptilia
- Order: Squamata
- Clade: Amphisbaenia
- Family: Amphisbaenidae
- Genus: Monopeltis
- Species: M. infuscata

Binomial name
- Monopeltis infuscata Broadley, 1997

= Monopeltis infuscata =

Species of amphisbaenian

Monopeltis infuscata, also known commonly as the dusky spade-snouted worm lizard, the dusky worm lizard, and the infuscate wedge-snouted amphisbaenian, is a species of amphisbaenian in the family Amphisbaenidae. The species is indigenous to southern Africa.

== Geographic range ==
M. infuscata is found in Angola, Botswana, Namibia, South Africa, and Zimbabwe.

== Habitat ==
The preferred natural habitats of M. infuscata are grassland, shrubland, and savanna, at altitudes of 800–1,700 m (2,600–5,600 ft).

== Description ==
M. infuscata is pinkish, both dorsally and ventrally. Adults usually have a snout-to-vent length (SVL) of 20–25 cm (7.9–9.8 in). The maximum recorded SVL is 28 cm (11 in).

== Reproduction ==
M. infuscata is viviparous. The adult female gives birth to a small brood in summer.
