= Amblyodipsas dimidiata =

Conservation status
- Least Concern (IUCN 3.1)

Scientific classification
- Kingdom: Animalia
- Phylum: Chordata
- Class: Reptilia
- Order: Squamata
- Suborder: Serpentes
- Family: Atractaspididae
- Genus: Amblyodipsas
- Species: A. dimidiata

Binomial name
- Amblyodipsas dimidiata (Günther, 1888)

Synonyms
- Rhinocalamus dimidiatus Günther, 1888

Species of snake

Amblyodipsas dimidiata, or the Mpwapwa purple-glossed snake, is a species of mildly venomous rear-fanged snake in the Atractaspididae family.

== Geographic range ==
It is endemic to northern Tanzania.

== Description ==
The snake is black dorsally; white ventrally, and is also colored white on the upper lip, and on three lower rows of dorsal scales on each side.

The rostral is very large, with a portion visible from above longer than its distance from the frontal; the internasals are more than twice as broad as they are long. The supraoculars are very small. The snake has six upper labials, the third in contact with the nasal and the prefrontal, the third and fourth entering the eye, and the fifth largest and in contact with the parietal.

The dorsal scales are smooth, without pits, arranged in 17 rows. Ventrals 192–215; anal divided; subcaudals 20–27, divided.

Adults may attain a total length of 47 cm (18 1/2 in), which includes a tail 3 cm (1 1/8 in) long.
