= Evolutionary Ecology (journal) =

- Subject: Evolutionary ecology
- Language: English
- Edited by: Matthew Symonds

Publication details
- History: 1987–present
- Publisher: Springer Science+Business Media
- Frequency: Bimonthly
- Impact factor: 2.133 (2017)

Standard abbreviations
- ISO 4: Evol. Ecol.

Indexing
- CODEN: EVECEJ
- ISSN: 0269-7653 (print); 1573-8477 (web)
- LCCN: 94648268
- OCLC no.: 173734101

Links
- Journal homepage; Online archive

Evolutionary Ecology is a bimonthly peer-reviewed scientific journal covering the study of ecology from an evolutionary perspective. It was established in 1987 and is published by Springer Science+Business Media. The editor-in-chief is Matthew Symonds (Deakin University). According to the Journal Citation Reports, the journal has a 2017 impact factor of 2.133.
