= Oviparity =

Reproduction via the laying of eggs

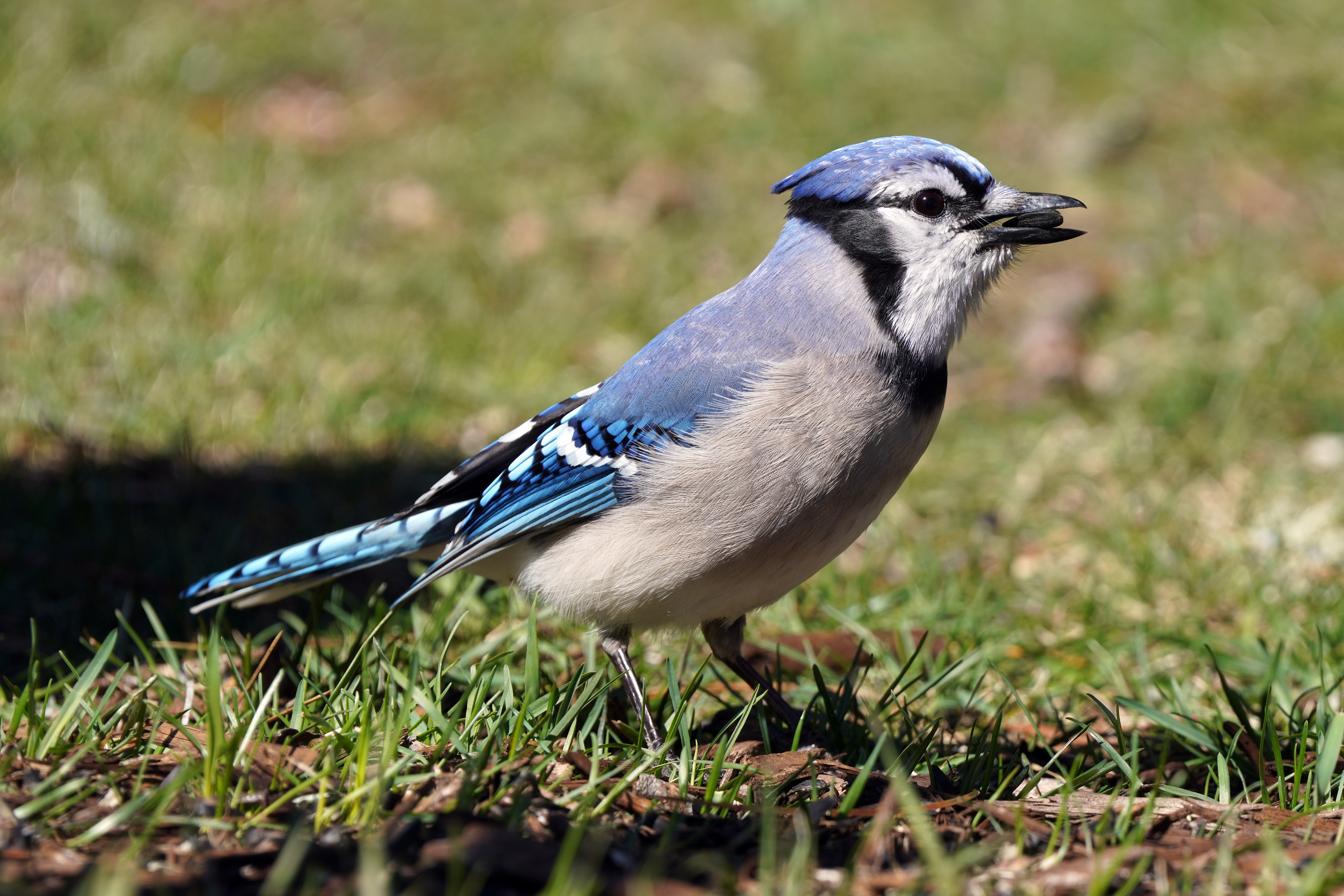
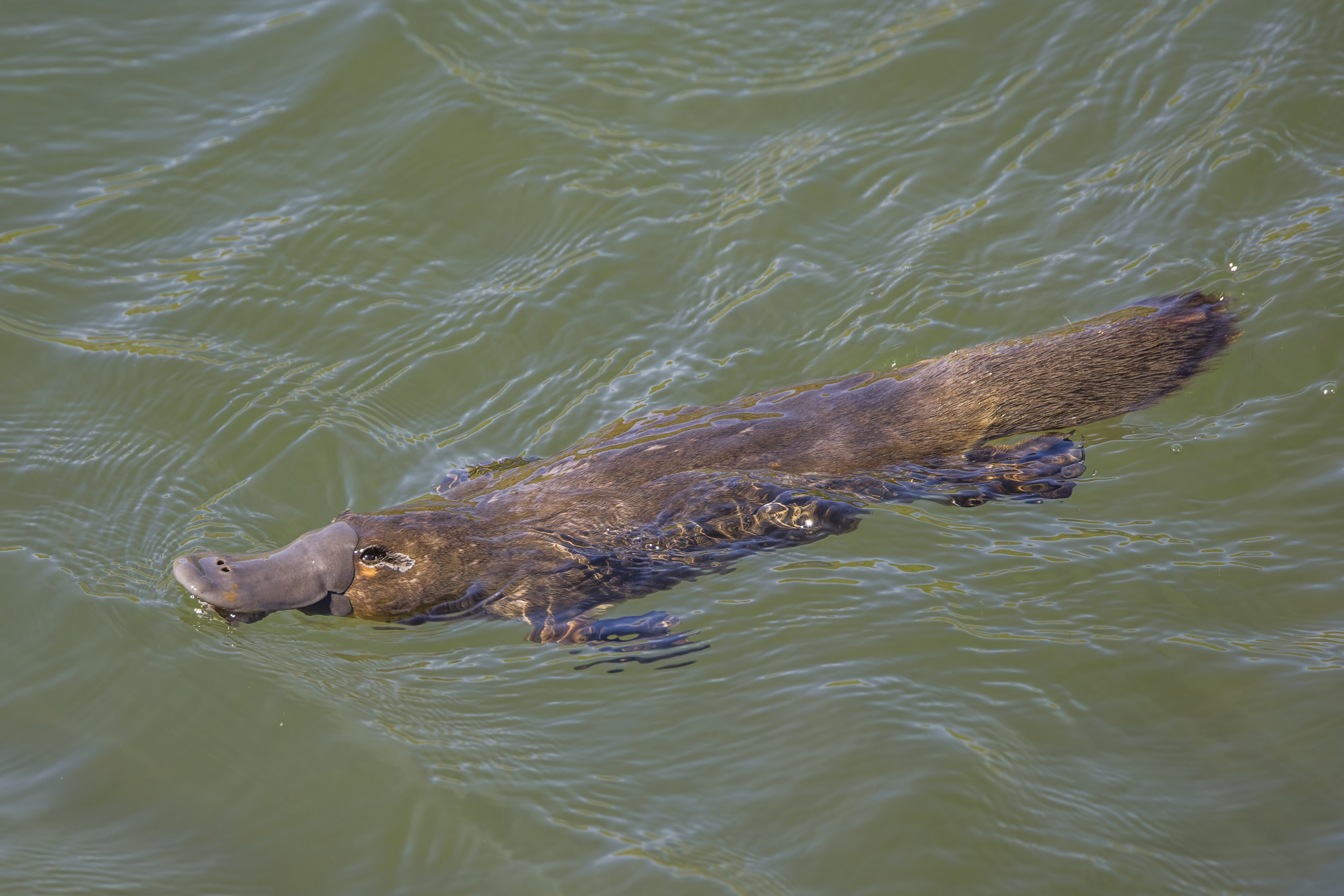
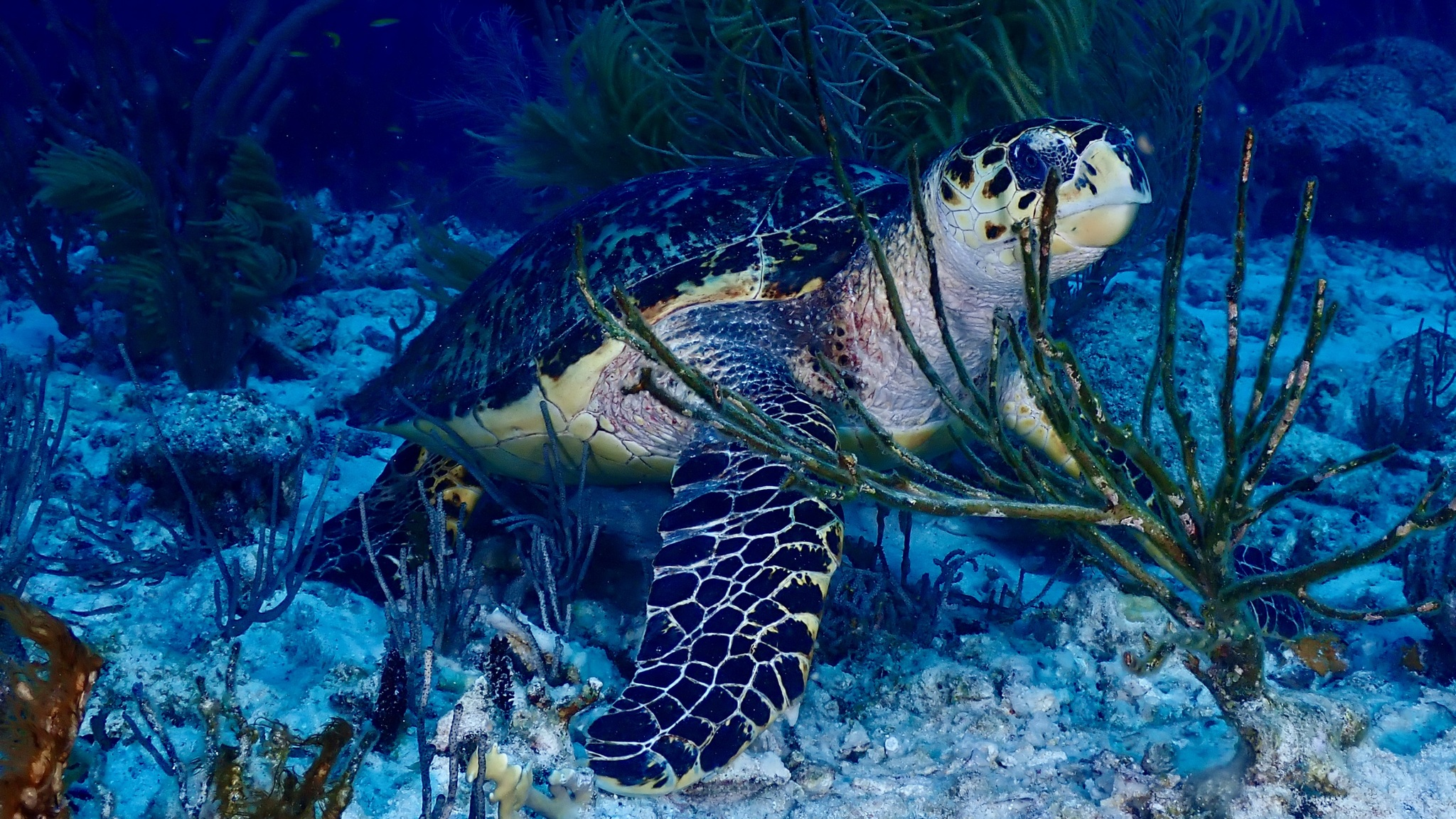
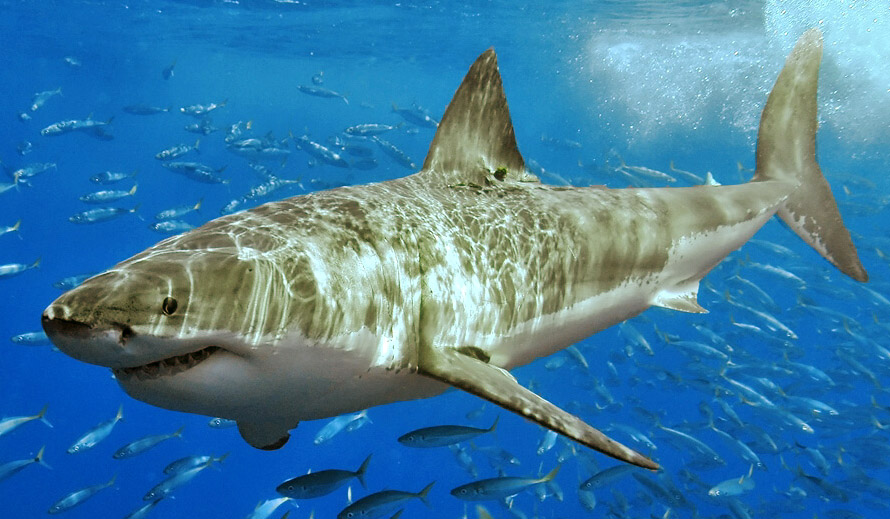
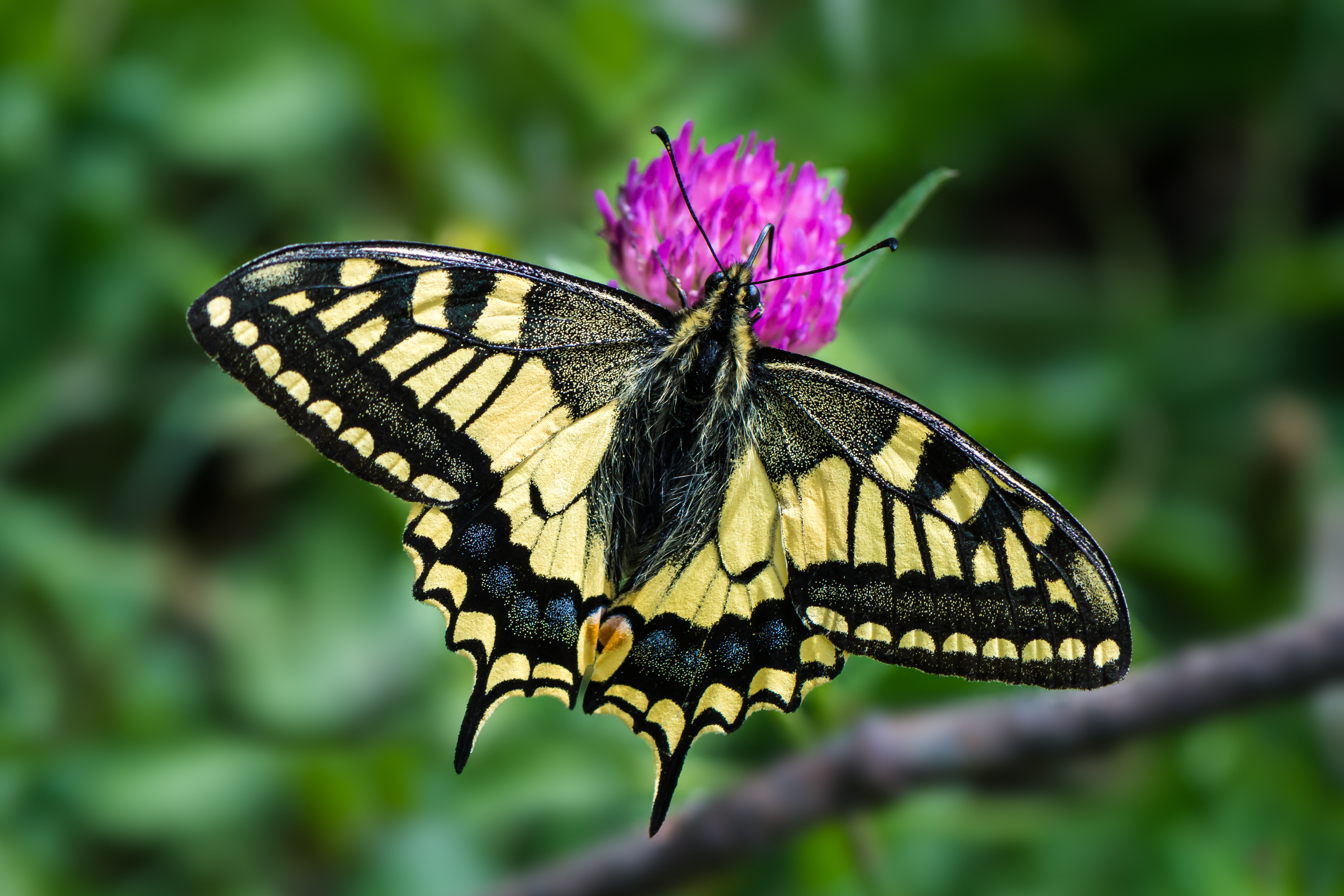
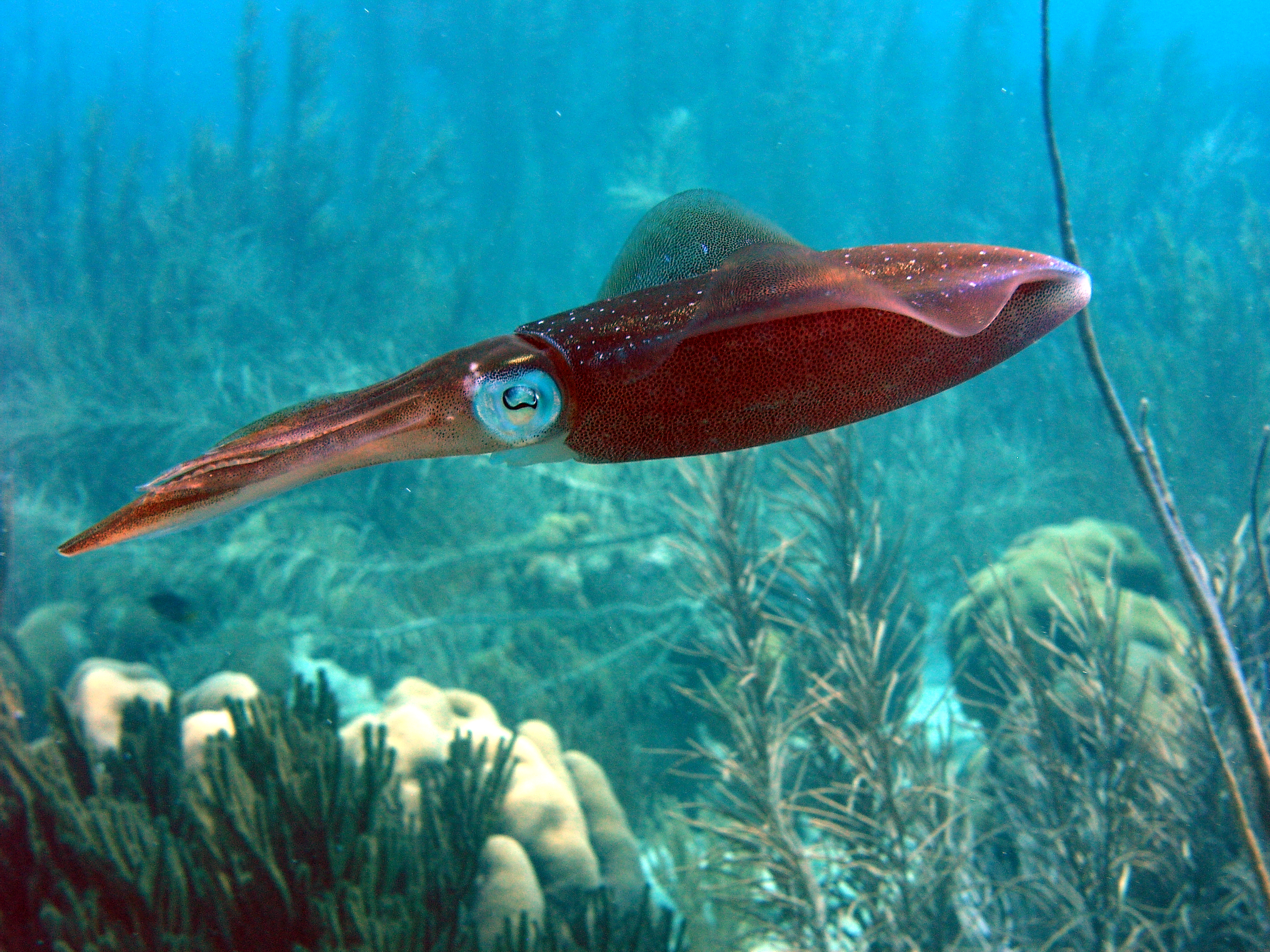
Examples of oviparous animals: Blue jay (a bird), platypus (a monotreme mammal), hawksbill sea turtle (a reptile), great white shark (a cartilaginous fish), Papilio machaon (a winged insect), Caribbean reef squid (a cephalopod)

Oviparous animals are animals that reproduce by depositing unfertilized egg cells or fertilized zygotes outside the body (i.e., by laying or spawning) in metabolically independent incubation organs (eggs), which nurture the embryo into moving offspring (hatchlings) with little or no embryonic development within the mother. This is the reproductive method used by most animal species, as opposed to viviparous animals that develop the embryos internally and metabolically dependent on the maternal circulation, until the mother gives birth to live juveniles.

Ovoviviparity is a special form of oviparity where the eggs are retained inside the mother (but still metabolically independent), and are carried internally until they hatch and eventually emerge outside as well-developed juveniles similar to viviparous animals.

== Modes of reproduction ==
The traditional modes of reproduction include oviparity, taken to be the ancestral condition, traditionally where either unfertilised oocytes or fertilised eggs are spawned, and viviparity traditionally including any mechanism where young are born live, or where the development of the young is supported by either parent in or on any part of their body.

However, the biologist Thierry Lodé recently divided the traditional category of oviparous reproduction into two modes that are distinguished on the basis of the relationship between the zygote (fertilised egg) and the parents:

- In whichever form they are laid, the eggs of most ovuliparous species contain a substantial quantity of yolk to support the growth and activity of the embryo after fertilization, and sometimes for some time after hatching as well. Among the vertebrates, ovuliparity is common among fishes and most amphibians. It also occurs among cnidarians, ctenophores, echinoderms, molluscs and several other aquatic animal phyla as well.
- Zygoparity, in which fertilization is internal, is taken to be the derived condition, whether the male injects the sperm into the female intromittently or whether she actively or passively picks it up — the female lays eggs containing zygotes with a substantial quantity of yolk to feed the embryo while it remains in the egg, and in many species to feed it for some time afterwards. The egg is not retained in the body for most of the period of development of the embryo within the egg, which is the main distinction between oviparity and ovoviviparity. Oviparity occurs in all birds, most reptiles, some fishes, and most arthropods. Among mammals, monotremes (four species of echidna, and the platypus) are uniquely oviparous.
- Embryoparity, in which the embryo develops for a significant amount of time before the egg is laid. The definitive embryo is formed, and may develop to an advanced state, before oviposition. The egg hatches outside the body.

In all but special cases of both ovuliparity and oviparity, the overwhelming source of nourishment for the embryo is the nutrients stored in the yolk, pre-deposited in the egg by the reproductive system of the mother (the vitellogenesis). Offspring that depend on yolk in this manner are said to be lecithotrophic, which literally means "feeding on yolk"; as opposed to matrotrophy, where the maternal circulation provides for the nutritional needs. Distinguishing between the definitions of oviparity and ovuliparity necessarily reduces the number of species whose modes of reproduction are classified as oviparous, as they no longer include the ovuliparous species such as most fish, most frogs and many invertebrates. Such classifications are largely for convenience and as such can be important in practice, but speaking loosely in contexts in which the distinction is not relevant, it is common to lump both categories together as just "oviparous".
