= Thierry Lodé =

French biologist

Thierry Lodé (born 1956 in Tarbes) is a French biologist and professor of evolutionary ecology in a CNRS lab at the University of Rennes 1.

His work deals mainly with sexual conflict.

== Selected works ==
- Thierry Lodé Darwin et après ? Manifeste pour une écologie évolutive 2014 Eds Odile Jacobs, Paris
- Thierry Lodé La biodiversité amoureuse, sexe et évolution 2011 Eds Odile Jacob ISBN 978-2-7381-2640-5
- Thierry Lodé La guerre des sexes chez les animaux, une histoire naturelle de la sexualité 2006 Eds Odile Jacob ISBN 2-7381-1901-8
- Thierry Lodé Les stratégies de reproduction des animaux 2001 Éditions Dunod Masson Sciences
- Thierry Lodé Génétique des populations 1998 Editions Ellipses
- Thierry Lodé 2011 Sex is not a good solution for reproduction: the libertine bubble theory. Bioessay 33: 419–432
- Thierry Lodé et al. 2004 Sex-biased predation by polecats influences the mating system of frogs. Proc Roy Soc 271 (S6):S399-S401
- Bifolchi A & Lodé Thierry 2005 Efficiency of conservation shortcuts: a long term investigation with otters as umbrella species. Biological Conservation 126: 523–527
- Thierry Lodé 2001. Genetic divergence without spatial isolation in polecat Mustela putorius populations. Journal of Evolutionary Biology.14 : 228–236
