= Modes of reproduction =

Ways animals produce their young

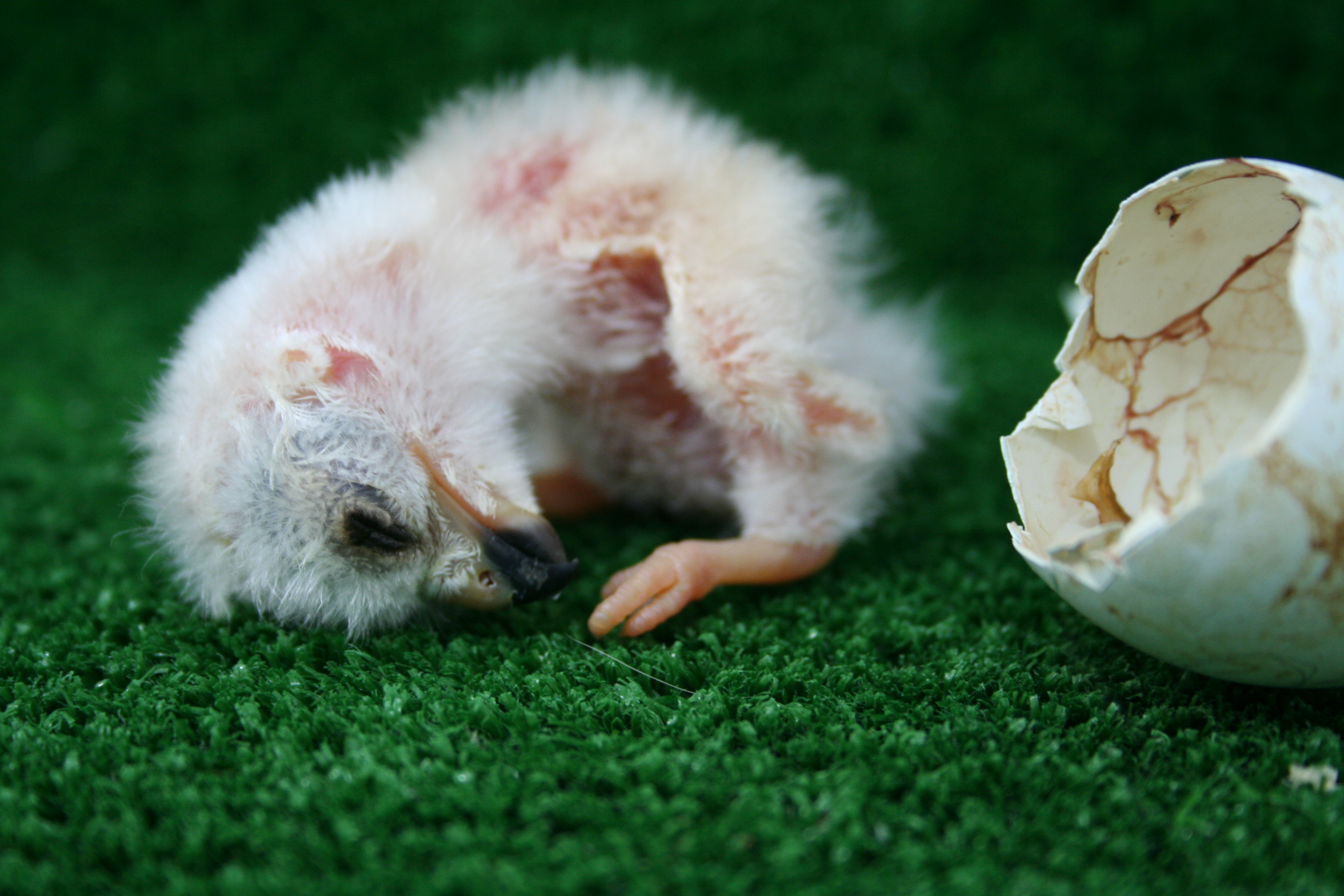
The mode of reproduction in birds combines internal fertilisation with oviparous development. Here a Montagu's harrier chick has just hatched from its egg.

Animals make use of a variety of modes of reproduction to produce their young. Traditionally this variety was classified into three modes, oviparity (embryos in eggs), viviparity (young born live), and ovoviviparity (intermediate between the first two).

However, each of those so-called traditional modes covered a wide range of diverse reproductive strategies. The biologist Thierry Lodé has accordingly proposed five modes of reproduction based on the relationship between the zygote (the fertilised egg) and the parents. His revised modes are ovuliparity, with external fertilisation; oviparity, with internal fertilisation of large eggs containing a substantial nutritive yolk; ovo-viviparity, that is oviparity where the zygotes are retained for a time in a parent's body, but without any sort of feeding by the parent; histotrophic viviparity, where the zygotes develop in the female's oviducts, but are fed on other tissues; and hemotrophic viviparity, where the developing embryos are fed by the mother, often through a placenta.

== Traditional modes ==
The three traditional modes of reproduction are:

- Oviparity, taken to be the ancestral condition, where either unfertilised oocytes or fertilised eggs are spawned.
- Viviparity, including any mechanism where young are born live, or where the development of the young is supported by either parent in or on any part of their body.
- Ovoviviparity, covering mechanisms which span the modes of oviparity and viviparity.

It can be seen that so defined, these traditional modes each cover a range of reproductive strategies.

== Revised modes ==
The biologist Thierry Lodé proposed (2001, 2012) five modes of reproduction based on the relationship between the zygote (fertilised egg) and the parents:

- Ovuliparity: fertilisation is external, the oocytes being released into the environment and fertilised outside the body by the male. This is common in molluscs, arthropods and fishes, and is found in most frogs.
- Oviparity: fertilisation is internal, but the female lays zygotes as eggs with a substantial quantity of yolk to feed the embryo while it remains in the egg. The egg is not retained in the body, or only for a limited time. Oviparity is found in insects, birds and some other reptiles. Among mammals, the monotremes are oviparous.
- Ovo-viviparity: or oviparity with retention of zygotes in either the female's or in the male's body, but there are no trophic interactions between zygote and parents. This mode is found in the slowworm, Anguis fragilis. In the sea horse, zygotes are retained in the male's ventral "marsupium". In the frog Rhinoderma darwinii, the zygotes develop in the vocal sac. In the recently extinct frogs Rheobatrachus, zygotes developed in the stomach.
- Histotrophic viviparity: the zygotes develop in the female's oviducts, but find their nutriments from other tissues, whether skin or glandular tissue, oophagy or adelphophagy (intra-uterine cannibalism in some sharks or in the black salamander Salamandra atra).
- Hemotrophic viviparity: nutrients are provided by the female, often through a placenta, as in mammals except for marsupials and monotremes. In the frog Gastrotheca ovifera, embryos are fed by the mother through specialized gills. The lizard Pseudemoia pagenstecheri and most mammals use this form of viviparity.

Thus the definition of oviparity is narrower in the revised scheme, as it does not include the "ovuliparity" found in most fish, most frogs and many invertebrates.

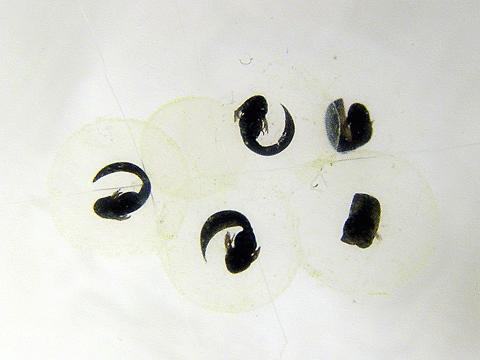
Ovuliparity: frog development inside soft egg (frogspawn) in pond water, fertilised outside body

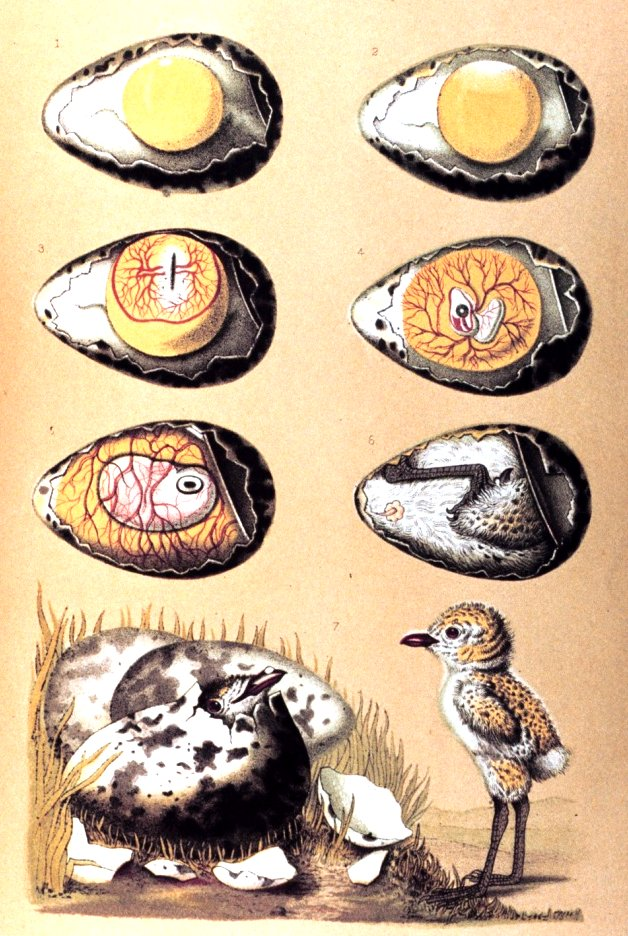
Oviparity: bird development inside shelled egg, with large food supply in yolk, after internal fertilisation

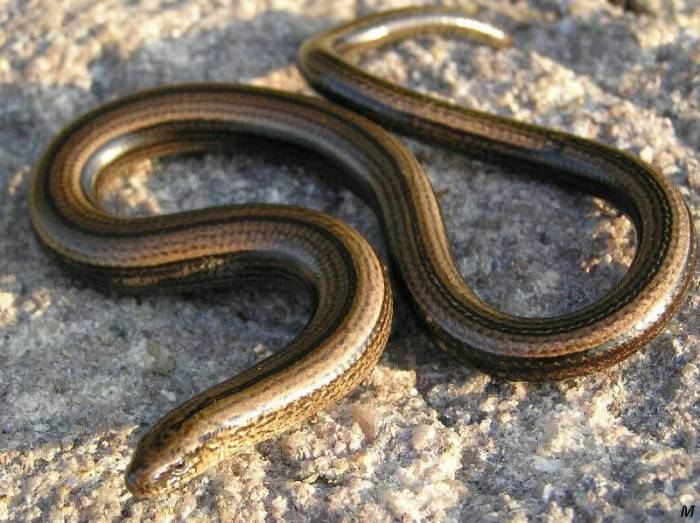
Ovoviviparity: slowworm gives birth to live young, after retaining the eggs inside her body

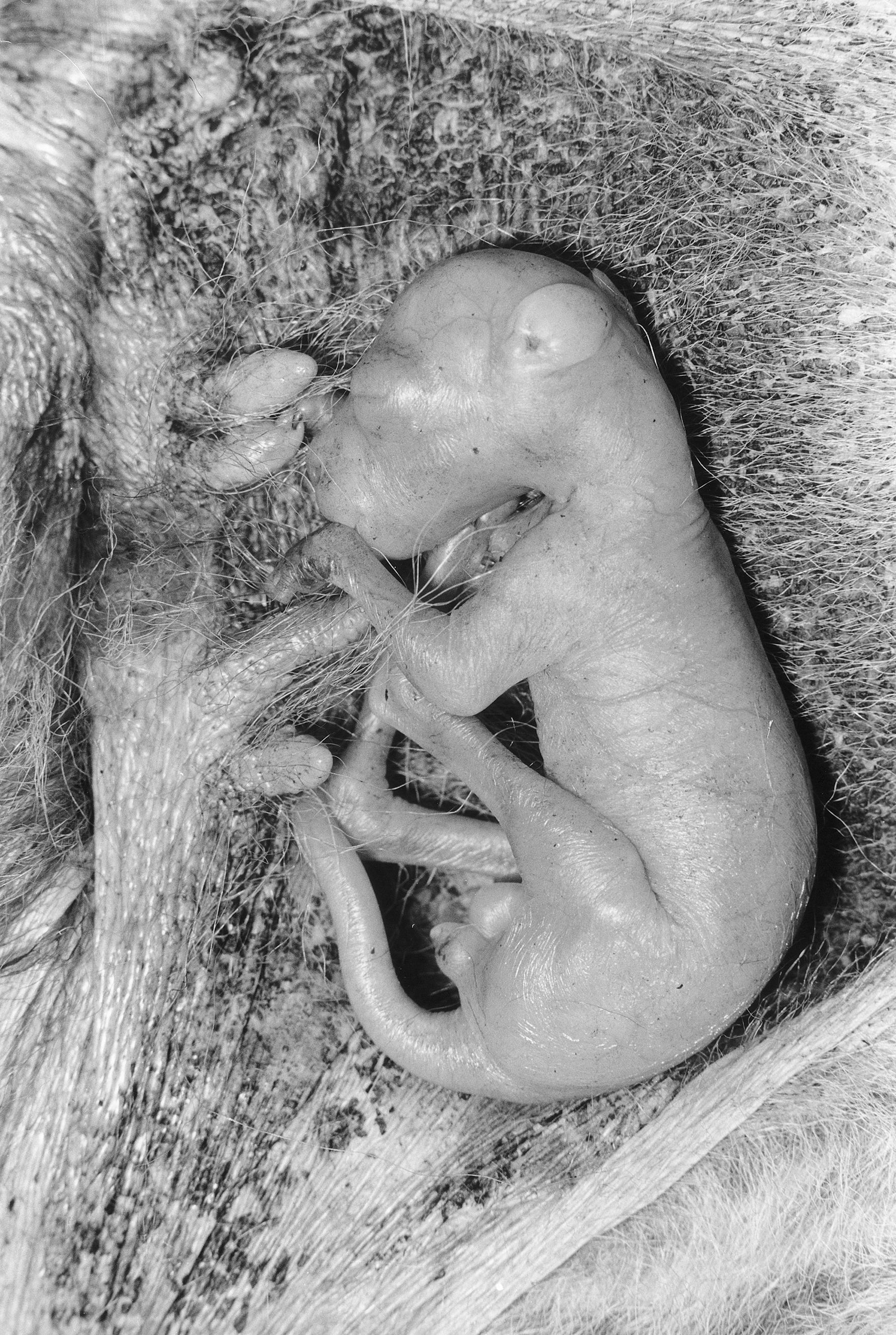
Histotrophic viviparity: kangaroo embryo at 50 days, feeding in the mother's marsupial pouch (outside the womb)

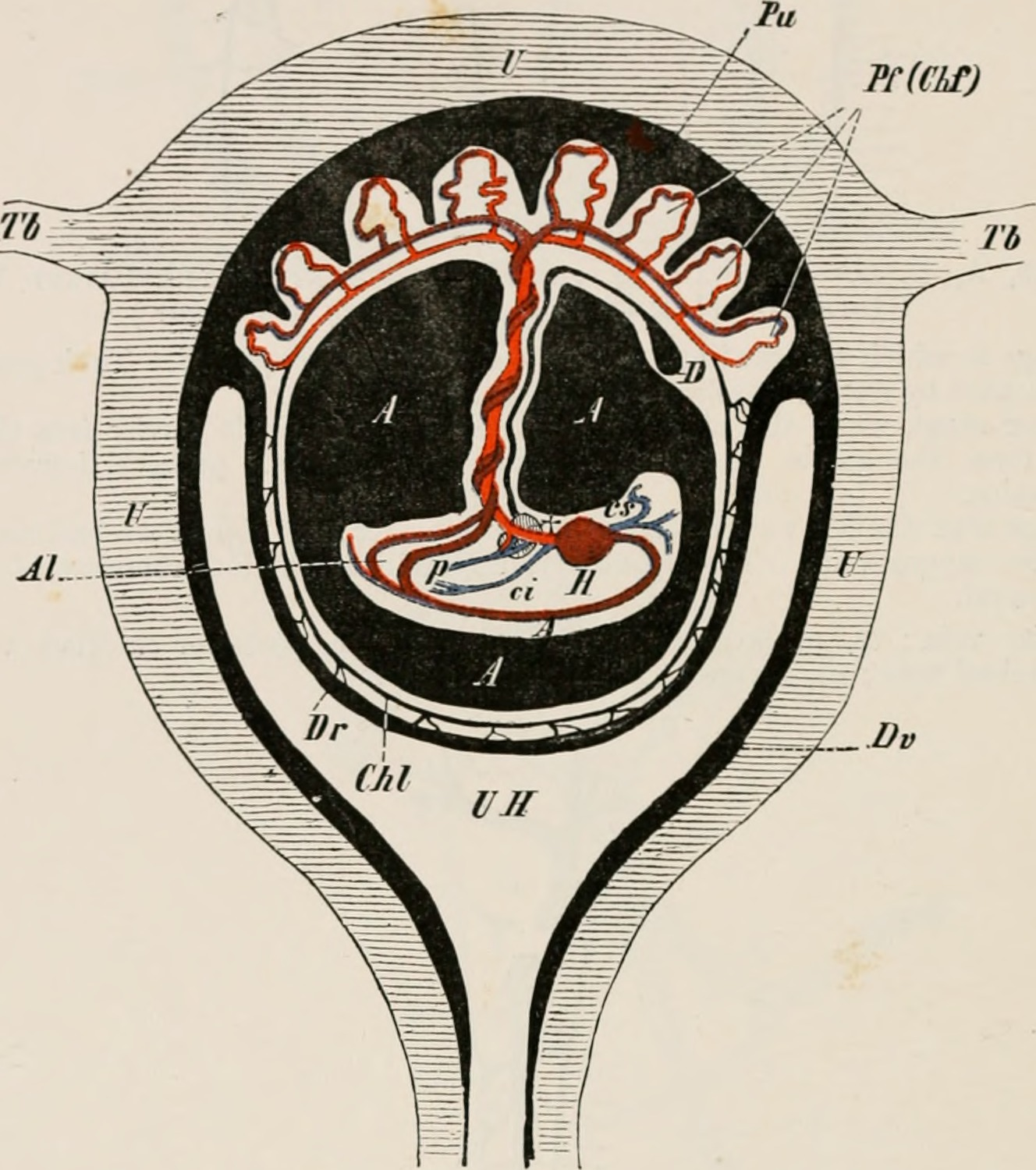
Hemotrophic viviparity: a mammal embryo (centre) attached by its umbilical cord to a placenta (top) which provides food
