= Glossary of ecology =

Wikimedia list

This glossary of ecology is a list of definitions of terms and concepts in ecology and related fields. For more specific definitions from other glossaries related to ecology, see Glossary of biology, Glossary of evolutionary biology, and Glossary of environmental science.

== A ==
abiotic component
adaptive behavior
In behavioral ecology, any behavior which contributes to an individual's reproductive success and is thus subject to the forces of natural selection.
allee effect
A concept in population ecology that describes the positive relationship between the size of a given population and its growth.
alpha diversity
The average species diversity of sites or habitats at a local scale. Alpha diversity combined with beta diversity yields gamma diversity.
animal behaviour
See ethology.
animal communication
animal migration
applied ecology
A branch of ecology which uses ecological principles and insights to solve environment-related problems. It includes agroecology and conservation biology.
aquatic plant
A vascular plant adapted to living in salt water or fresh water aquatic environments.
area effect
The biogeographic hypothesis that larger islands are able to support more species than smaller ones.
atmosphere
Earth's atmosphere is composed of gases and water which are retained by Earth's gravity and help to retain heat and reflect UV radiation from the Sun.
autecology
A major sub-field of ecology which studies the dynamics of populations and the ways in which they interact with the environment. Also called population ecology.
autopoiesis
The phenomenon by which a system is capable of producing and maintaining itself by creating its own parts. The term has often been applied to the self-maintaining chemistry of biological cells.
autotroph
See producer.

== B ==
bacterivore
An organism that feeds primarily or exclusively on bacteria.
behavioral ecology
A branch of ecology which studies the ecological and evolutionary basis of animal behavior, mainly at the level of individual animals.
benthos
beta diversity
The ratio between regional and local species diversity, or the difference in diversity between different habitats. Compare alpha diversity and gamma diversity.
biodegradable
Capable of decaying through the action of living organisms.
biodiversity
Diversity among and within plant and animal species in a given environment.
biogeochemistry
The science that studies the effects of biota on global chemistry and on the cycles of matter and energy that transport Earth's chemical components in time and space.
biogeochemical cycle
A pathway through which a chemical element or molecule moves through the atmosphere, hydrosphere, lithosphere, and biosphere.
biogeographic realm
The largest division of the Earth's surface filled with living organisms, whether terrestrial, freshwater, or marine.
biogeography
The study of the geographic distribution of species on Earth.
bio-invader
A non-native species.
biological dispersal
The movement of organisms from their birth site to their breeding site or from one breeding site to another.
biological magnification
The increase in concentration of a chemical substance in the tissues of organisms comprising successively higher levels in a food chain.
biological organization
biomass
The sum of all living organisms in a given area.
biomass pyramid
A graph that illustrates the productivity (in terms of biomass) within the various trophic levels comprising a food chain. Also called an ecological pyramid.
biome
The total complex of biotic communities occupying and characterizing a particular area.
biosphere
The global sum of all ecosystems on Earth.
biota
The total collection of organisms belonging to a particular geographic region or extant during a particular time period.
biotic component
biotic potential
The maximum achievable rate of increase of a population in a given area under ideal conditions.
boreal forest
Forest areas of the northern temperate zone, mostly consisting of conifers; also called taiga in Siberia.

== C ==
camouflage
An inconspicuous appearance adopted by an organism in order to deceive possible predators or prey.
canopy
carbon cycle
The biogeochemical cycle by which carbon is exchanged between Earth's biosphere, pedosphere, geosphere, hydrosphere, and atmosphere.
carrying capacity
The maximum number of individuals a given environment's resources can support, including the food and water available for that environment.
charismatic megafauna
A large animal species with widespread popular appeal that environmental activists use to achieve conservation goals well beyond just those species. Examples include the giant panda, the Bengal tiger, and the blue whale. Compare flagship species.
chemical ecology
A branch of ecology which studies the use by organisms of naturally occurring chemical compounds for various purposes, e.g. in defense against predators.
climate
The long-term average weather patterns of a particular place.
climate change
Current rise in Earth's average temperature and its effects
climax community
A community of biological species that has reached a stable state, occurring when the different species are best adapted to average conditions in a given area.
colony
commensalism
A symbiotic relationship between two organisms of different species, in which one of the organisms benefits while the other remains unaffected.
community
An assemblage of various organisms living in the same environment.
community ecology
A branch of ecology which studies the interactions between the species comprising an ecological community. Also called synecology.
competition
Organisms from the same or from different species competing with each other for food, living space, reproductive success, or any other limited resource; the most adapted individuals come out on top and thus survive and reproduce.
competitive exclusion principle

A biological rule which states that two species cannot coexist in the same environment if they are competing for exactly the same resource, often memorably summarized as "complete competitors cannot coexist".
coniferous forest
One of the primary terrestrial biomes, culminating in the taiga.
conservation biology
The study of Earth's biodiversity with the aim of protecting and conserving natural habitats and the plant and animal species living in them.
consumer
Any organism, usually an animal, that feeds on plants or other animals. Compare heterotroph.
cooperation
The process by which organisms work together for mutual benefit.
coral reef
courtship display
Ritual social behavior between possible mates.
cryosphere
The combined portions of Earth's surface where water is frozen in solid form as ice, including sea ice, lake ice, river ice, snow, glaciers, ice caps, ice sheets, and frozen ground such as permafrost. There is significant overlap with the hydrosphere.

== D ==
deciduous broadleaf forest
Any forest situated in a temperate zone whose trees shed their leaves during the cold season.
decomposer
Any organism that breaks down organic matter into simpler compounds.
decomposition
The process by which tissues of dead organisms are broken down by both biotic and abiotic processes into simpler forms of organic matter, thereby clearing the limited available space in a biome.
deep sea community
Any community of organisms linked by a shared habitat in the deepest parts of a sea or ocean.
deforestation
denitrification
The breakdown by anaerobic bacteria of nitrates, mostly in the soil, into their constituent chemical elements: nitrogen and oxygen.
density dependence
The dependence of the growth rate of a population of a given species on its density.
desert
A landscape that receives less than 10 inches (250 mm) of precipitation per year.
desert ecology
The study of the interactions between both biotic and abiotic factors that occur in desert biomes, including interactions between plant, animal, and bacterial populations in desert communities.
desertification
The process by which ecosystems become arid, barren, or desert-like, with a lower and different biodiversity than they originally supported.
detrital food web
A food web depicting the energy flow from photoautotrophs through detritivores and decomposers.
detritivore
A heterotrophic organism which feeds primarily on detritus – decomposing bits of organic matter, such as plant litter.
disturbance
A temporary change in environmental conditions that causes a pronounced and longer-lasting change in an ecosystem. Disturbances can quickly and dramatically alter the physical structure and arrangement of both biotic and abiotic elements, and often greatly impact local biodiversity. They may be products of natural phenomena, such as storms, wildfires, and volcanic eruptions, as well as of man-made phenomena, such as deforestation, pollution, and construction projects.
dominance hierarchy
The organization of individual organisms into groups with a social structure.
dominance species
A species which characterizes and dominates an ecological community as measured by its primary productivity or biomass.

== E ==
earth science
earth system science
ecology
The scientific study of interactions between living organisms and their environment.
ecology of fear
A framework describing the psychological impact that predator-induced stress experienced by animals has on populations and ecosystems.
ecological economics
ecological extinction
ecological land classification
ecological literacy
The ability to understand the natural systems that make life on Earth possible.
ecological niche
See niche.
ecological selection
ecological processes that operate on a species' inherited traits without reference to mating or secondary sex characteristics.
ecological succession
The change in the species structure of an ecological community over time.
ecological threshold
ecophagy
The destruction of an ecosystem.
ecophysiology
The study of the interaction of the physiological traits of an organism with its abiotic environment.
ecopoiesis
The hypothetical shaping by human action of a sustainable ecosystem on a currently lifeless, sterile planet.
ecoregion
A region defined by its geography and ecology.
ecosynthesis
The use of introduced species to fill niches in a disrupted environment with the aim of increasing the speed of ecological restoration.
ecosystem
The total of interacting organisms (biocoenosis) and non-living things (biotope) in a specific environment.
ecosystem ecology
A branch of ecology which studies how flows of energy and matter interact with biotic elements of ecosystems.
ecosystem engineer
ecosystem functional type
ecosystem modeling
The use of mathematics, computer programs and models to understand and predict ecosystem behavior.
ecosystem services
Resources and processes provided in an ecosystem and which benefit organisms.
ecotone
A transition area between two adjacent but different landscape patches.
ecotope
ecotoxicology
The study of the ecological role of toxic chemicals (often pollutants, but also naturally occurring compounds).
ecozone
An area that has characteristics of natural origin such as climate, terrain, vegetation, etc. It may used as a synonym for biogeographic realm.
El Niño
A band of anomalously warm ocean water temperatures that occasionally develops off the coast of South America and can cause climatic changes across the Pacific Ocean.
emigration
For an organism, leaving its native community for a new one.
endangered species
A species at imminent risk of becoming extinct.
energy pyramid
A graphical representation designed to show the biomass or biomass productivity at each trophic level in a given ecosystem.
environment
The biotic and abiotic surroundings of an organism or population, and the chemical interactions between these factors that influence their survival, development, and evolution. An environment can vary in scale from microscopic to global.
environmental degradation
environmental science
environmental restoration
undoing the damage caused to an area by human activity or by natural disasters.
ephemerality
The concept of things being transitory, existing only briefly.
estuary
A body of coastal water, attached to both ocean and river, often coloured black as a result of silt and sediment being carried by the latter.
ethology
The study of animal behavior.
eutrophication
An increase in natural or chemical nutrients in an ecosystem. This increase of nutrients typically stimulates growth of some aggressive plant species and hampers that of others, thereby harming biodiversity. In aquatic ecosystems, it may result in hypoxia.
evaporation
The slow vaporization of water from either the soil or from surface water.
evolutionary ecology

The evolutionary changes occurring to an organism within its population or within the wider community.
exotic species
An introduced species not native or endemic to a habitat.
extinction
The termination of an organism or of a taxon, usually a species, which occurs when the last individual organism of the taxon dies. Compare functional extinction.
extinction vortex
extreme environment
An environment in which few living organisms can survive.
extremophile
An organism which thrives in physically or geochemically extreme conditions.

== F ==
fall overturn
The mixing (or "turning over") of lake water occurring in autumn, facilitating its re-oxygenation.
fire ecology
A branch of ecology which studies the ecological role of naturally occurring wildfires.
fixed action pattern
In ethology, an instinctive behavioral pattern.
flagship species
A species chosen to represent an environmental cause, such as an ecosystem in need of conservation.
food chain
A group of organisms interrelated by the fact that each member of the group feeds upon the one below it.
food density
The amount of food available within a given ecotope.
food web
A set of interconnected food chains by which energy and nutrients circulate within an ecosystem.
forest ecology
A branch of ecology that studies the interrelated patterns, processes, flora, fauna, and ecosystems within forests.
foundation species
A species that is a dominant primary producer in its ecosystem, both in terms of abundance and influence on other organisms and the environment.
founder effect
The accumulation of random genetic changes in an isolated population.
freshwater biology
functional ecology
A branch of ecology which studies the roles, or functions, that certain species (or groups of species) play in an ecosystem.
functional extinction
The effective extinction of a species or other taxon such that reports of its existence cease, the reduced population no longer plays a significant role in ecosystem function, or the population is no longer viable because it is unable to sustain healthy reproduction, even if the last individual organism of the species has not yet died.
functional response
The intake rate of a consumer as a function of food density.
fungus
Along with bacteria, fungi are the major decomposers in most terrestrial (and some aquatic) ecosystems and therefore play a crucial role in the nutrient cycle.

== G ==
gallery forest
A relatively dense area of trees and shrubs that occupies a corridor along a river or within a wetland and projects into landscapes that are otherwise only sparsely treed, such as savannas, grasslands, and deserts.
gamma diversity
Gause's law
See competitive exclusion principle.
genetic bottleneck
An evolutionary event in which a significant percentage of a population or species is killed or otherwise prevented from reproducing.
geodiversity
The variety of geological and hydrological materials, forms, landscapes, and processes that constitute and shape the Earth, either as a whole or some specific part of it. Geodiversity can be viewed as somewhat of an abiotic equivalent to biodiversity.
geographical zone
global ecology
See macroecology.
global ecophagy
The destruction of Earth's ecosystems.
global warming
The increase in the average temperature of Earth's near-surface atmosphere and oceans.
Gloger's rule
An ecogeographical rule which states that within a species of endotherms, more heavily pigmented forms or morphs tend to be found in more humid and/or sunnier environments, e.g. near the Equator. The phenomenon has been observed across a wide variety of animal species, and evolutionary explanations for it range from deterrence of microbial growth to protection against ultraviolet radiation.
grassland
An area where the vegetation is dominated by grasses.
greenhouse effect
The warming of the Earth's climate that results from solar irradiance being trapped in the atmosphere. The phenomenon is caused by atmospheric gases which allow the sun's energy to reach the Earth's surface but subsequently absorb heat that is radiated back from the warmed surface.
ground cover
Any plant that grows over an area of ground, providing protection of the topsoil from erosion and drought.
guest
The generic term used for parasitic, mutualistic, and commensalist symbionts.

== H ==
habitat
A specific ecological area that is inhabited by a specific plant or animal species.
habitat fragmentation
The discontinuation of a species' habitat as caused by environmental change.
halophyte
A salt-loving plant.
halophile
A salt-loving organism.
heath
Low-growing woody vegetation found on free-draining acidic soils.
heterotroph
See consumer.
homeostasis
The property of a system by which it regulates its internal environment and maintains a constant and stable condition; e.g. endothermic animals maintaining a constant body temperature.
host
An organism that harbors a parasitic, mutualistic, or commensal symbiont.
human ecology
A branch of ecology that studies the relationships between humans and their natural, social, and built environments.
humus
hydrologic cycle
The cycle or process of evaporation and condensation of water and its distribution across the Earth as driven by solar energy. Also called the water cycle.
hydrophyte
See aquatic plant.
hydrosphere
The combined mass of water found on, under and above the surface of the Earth.
hydrothermal vent
An underwater steaming fissure that has a unique ecosystem.
hypoxia
Reduced oxygen content of air or a body of water, detrimental to aerobic organisms.

== I ==
illegitimate receiver
An organism that intercepts a signal intended for another organism, to the fitness detriment of either the signaler or the legitimate receiver of the signal.
indicator species
Any living species that defines a trait or characteristic of its environment. The presence and/or abundance of organisms of these species can be used as an indication of the health of a given ecosystem.
instinctive behavior
The inherent inclination of an organism towards a particular complex behavior.
insular biogeography
The study of the distributions of biological communities on islands.
intermediate disturbance hypothesis
A theory that tries to predict how species diversity will change with varying levels of disturbance.
interspecific competition
A form of competition that occurs between individuals of different species, e.g. when different species try to use the same resources in an environment. Contrast intraspecific competition.
intertidal zone
A coastal area periodically submerged underwater by the action of tides.
intraspecific competition
A form of competition that occurs between individuals of the same species, e.g. when members of the same species compete for territories or access to mates. Compare interspecific competition.
invasive species
A non-native species whose introduction to an area causes economic or environmental harm or harm to human health.
ion exchange
A reversible chemical reaction where ions with the same charge are switched. This principle is used in the purification of waste water.

== J ==
jungle
A dense, wet, humid forest, often tropical, which supports a large variety of wild plant and animal species.

== K ==
k-selected species
A species that forms a group of strong competitors in a crowded environment and that has fewer but stronger offspring. Contrast r-selected species.
kelp
keystone species
A species that has a disproportionate effect on its environment relative to its abundance. Such species affect many other organisms in an ecosystem and help to determine the types and numbers of various other species in a community.

== L ==
La Niña
The counterpart to El Niño.
lake
An inland body of water localized in a basin and often fed by a river.
lake ecosystem
lake stratification
landscape ecology
An interdisciplinary branch of ecology combining aspects of ecology, botany, biogeography, physical geography and environmental planning.
large marine ecosystems
The 64 global extensive coastal sea areas, as indicated by the National Oceanic and Atmospheric Administration, where primary production and biomass are higher than in the open ocean.
lek mating
An animal mating system in which an aggregation of male animals gathers to engage in competitive displays to entice females during the breeding season.
lichen
A composite organism that is the result of a symbiosis between algae or cyanobacteria and the hyphae of a fungus. The combined lichen has properties different from those of its component organisms.
life form
An entity or being that is living.
limiting factor
Any essential resource that is in short supply in a given environment and therefore limits the possibilities for change in other aspects of the same environment.
limnology
The study of inland waters, often regarded as forming part of ecology or of environmental science.
lithosphere
The outermost shell of a terrestrial-type planet or natural satellite.
logistic curve
An S-shaped curve that usually represents growth of a population of a given species.
Lotka–Volterra equation
A mathematical equation used to describe the predator–prey interaction between two given species.

== M ==
macroecology
A branch of ecology which examines ecological phenomena at the largest possible scale. Compare microecology.
mangrove wetland
Mangroves are shrubs or small trees that grow in coastal saline or brackish water in the tropics and provide a habitat to many marine organisms.
marine ecosystem
An aquatic ecosystem dominated and defined by the presence of saline water.
marine snow
Tiny particles, including dead organic matter from the upper layers of the ocean, sinking deep into the ocean.
mark and recapture
An observational methodology used to estimate variables of a population under study, including population density, survival rates, movement, and growth.
marsh
A wetland dominated by herbaceous rather than woody plant species and often found at the edges of lakes and streams, where it forms a transition between the aquatic and terrestrial ecosystems.
mesopredator release hypothesis
A hypothesis which states that as top predators dwindle in an ecosystem, an increase in the different populations of mesopredators occurs.
metabolic theory of ecology
A theory that explains the relationship between an organism's body mass and metabolic rate.
microbial ecology
A branch of ecology that studies microorganisms.
micro-climate
A local set of atmospheric conditions that differ from those in surrounding areas.
microecology
A branch of ecology which studies ecological phenomena at very small scales. Contrast macroecology.
migration
The movement of organisms from one place to another.
mimicry
An adaptive similarity of one species to another that protects one or both species from predators.
molecular ecology
A branch of ecology concerned with applying molecular population genetics, molecular phylogenetics, and genomics to traditional ecological questions. It is essentially the same as ecological genetics.
monsoon
The predictable occurrence of dramatic seasonal changes in atmospheric circulation and precipitation patterns.
mutualism
A form of symbiosis from which both individual organisms involved derive a fitness benefit.

== N ==
natural resource
Natural biotic and abiotic resources combined.
natural science
natural selection
nature
negative feedback loop
A process in which the effects of a change in a system act to reduce or counteract the change. Negative feedback loops tend to promote stability and a settling to equilibrium, reducing the effects of perturbations in the system. Contrast positive feedback loop.
neutralism
The belief that changes in evolution are caused by random mutation rather than by natural selection.
niche
A position or function of an organism in a community of related organisms.
niche construction
The process by which an organism alters its own or another organism's ecological niche.
niche differentiation
See resource partitioning.
nitrification
The oxidation of ammonia with oxygen into nitrite.
nitrogen cycle
The continuous cycle by which atmospheric nitrogen and compounded nitrogen are continually exchanged through the soil into substances that can be taken up and used by green plants; what is left returns to the atmosphere as a result of denitrification.
nitrogen fixation
The conversion of nitrogen into nitrogen compounds (ex. nitrate, nitrite) that is carried out naturally by certain bacteria and algae.
numerical response
A change in predator density as a function of change in prey density.
nutrient
Chemical elements and compounds that provide organisms with the necessary nourishment.
nutrient cycle
The movement and exchange of organic and inorganic matter back into the production of living matter. Also called ecological recycling.
nutrient cycle efficiency
See ecosystem ecology.

== O ==
ocean
A vast body of salt water. Oceans cover almost 75% of the Earth's surface.
old field
oxygenation

== P ==
paleoecology
A branch of ecology which uses data from fossils to reconstruct ecosystems of the past.
parasite
An organism that depends for its survival on a symbiotic relationship with another organism — its host — which it does not usually kill directly but does negatively affect.
parasitoid
A small insect whose immature stages develop either within or attached to the outside of other insects, referred to as hosts. Parasitoids eventually kill the host they feed on.
permafrost
The permanently frozen layer of terrain found beneath the arctic tundra.
pheromone
A chemical excreted into the environment as a signal, which causes a natural behavioral response in members of the same population.
phosphorus cycle
The biogeochemical cycle that describes the movement of phosphorus through the environment.
phytophysiognomy
The overall physical characteristics of a plant community.
phytoplankton
pioneer species
A species that is the first to inhabit a previously unoccupied environment or niche.
plankton
plant
plant community
plant litter
The layer of dead plant material on the ground, providing a habitat to plants, microorganisms and animals. It plays an important role in the nutrient cycle.
plant nutrition
polar climate
political ecology
A branch of ecology which studies how political and economic power affect ecosystems, and vice versa how environmental factors influence social activity.
pollination
A type of fertilization in which pollen grains are transported through the air from one seed plant to the ovule-bearing organs of another seed plant. This transport is helped by either wind, water, or animal assistance.
pollinator decline
population density
The number of individuals of a species living in a defined area.
population distribution
See range.
population ecology
A branch of ecology which deals with the dynamics of populations within species, and the interactions of these populations with environmental factors. Also called autecology.
population size
The number of individuals of a species in a particular population.
positive feedback loop
A process in which the effects of a small change in a system include an increase in the magnitude of the change; "A produces more of B, which in turn produces more of A". Contrast negative feedback loop.
prairie
predation
predator
An organism that lives by killing and consuming other living organisms.
prey
An organism upon which a predator feeds.
primary production
The production of organic compounds out of carbon dioxide present in the Earth's atmosphere. All life on Earth directly or indirectly depends on it.
producer
An organism that produces its own food from inorganic material present in the environment, through photosynthesis or, in the deep sea, through chemosynthesis. Also called a primary producer.
protocooperation
A type of mutualism without necessity.
productivity

== Q ==
quadrat
A rectangular plot of land extensively studied for its ecology. Often abbreviated as quad.

== R ==
rain shadow
An area with a consistently arid or semi-arid climate due to its position in the lee of a mountain range.
range
The distribution of a species in the geographical area within which that species can be found.
resource
A substance or object in the environment required by an organism for normal growth, maintenance, and reproduction.
resource partitioning
The coexistence of two or more competing species that use the same natural resource but in different ways.
restoration ecology
A branch of ecology which attempts to understand the ecological basis needed to restore impaired or damaged ecosystems.
riparian forest
river ecosystem
root microbiome
r-selected species
A species selected for its superiority in variable or unpredictable environments. Contrast k-selected species.
runoff
The flow of water over land from rain, melting snow, or other sources.

== S ==
saprotrophic nutrition
savanna
A tropical or subtropical grassland ecosystem with trees, but without a closed canopy.
scramble competition
secondary succession
A stage of ecological succession which occurs after the original community has been destroyed or disturbed, as with a forest fire.
selfish herd
Individuals in a group acting together without planned direction.
sessile
sexecology
A form of environmental activism based around nature fetishism.
sexual selection
sign stimulus
A fixed action pattern such as a mating dance.
signaler
social animal
social behavior
The behavior of an individual organism towards other members of the population of its species.
social parasite
sociality
is the degree to which individuals in an animal population tend to associate in social groups and form cooperative societies.
soil
The naturally occurring, unconsolidated or loose covering of Earth's surface; part of the pedosphere.
soil ecology
A branch of ecology which studies the pedosphere.
soil microbiology
song system
A series of discrete brain nuclei in songbirds used to learn and produce certain sequences.
source-sink dynamics
A theoretical model used by ecologists to describe how variation in habitat quality may affect the population growth or decline of organisms.
speciation
The evolutionary process by which new biological species emerge from a common ancestor.
species diversity
species evenness
species richness
spring overturn
The mixing of lake water through the melting of ice cover, the warming of surface waters, convection currents, and wind action occurring in spring.
steppe
sulfur cycle
stream
A flowing-water ecosystem that starts out as a freshwater spring or as melting snow.
survivorship curve
A graph showing the number or proportion of individuals surviving at each age for a given species.
symbiosis
Any type of a close and long-term biological interaction between two different biological organisms.
symbiont
synecology
See community ecology.
systems ecology

== T ==
Taylor's law
temperate deciduous forest
See deciduous broadleaf forest.
temperate grasslands, savannas, and shrublands
terrestrial ecology
terrestrial ecoregion
territory
An area that one or more individual organisms defend against competition from other organisms.
thermal ecology
The study of the relationship between temperature and organisms.
threat display
A signal used by individual organisms of certain species meaning that the user intends to attack.
theoretical ecology
The development of ecological theory, usually with mathematical, statistical and/or computer modeling tools.
tree line
Any delineation between habitats in which trees are capable of growing and in which they are not capable of growing. Tree lines are found at the edges of habitats with suitable conditions for tree growth and development; beyond the tree line, trees cannot tolerate the harsher environmental conditions, usually because of very cold temperatures or a lack of sufficient moisture.
trophic cascade
trophic level
The position of an organism within a food chain: what it eats, and what eats it.
tropics
tropical rain forest
A biome characterized by regular, heavy rainfall, a humidity of at least 80 percent, and great biodiversity.
tundra
A permanently frozen, treeless expanse between the ice cap and tree line of arctic regions.

== U ==
umbrella species
A species selected for making conservation-related decisions because protecting it indirectly protects the many other species that make up the ecological community of its habitat. Compare flagship species.
upwelling
Wind-driven motion of cooler nutrient-rich ocean water towards the ocean's surface, which stimulates the growth of phytoplankton.
urban ecology
A branch of ecology which studies ecosystems in urban areas.

== V ==
vegetation
Ground cover provided by plants.
vegetation formation
A concept used to classify vegetation communities.
vegetation type
See plant community.
Verhulst equation
virology
virus
A microscopic obligate intracellular parasite which infects and replicates exclusively within the living cells of host organisms.

== W ==
warning coloration

A warning signal consisting of brightly colored or starkly contrasting patterns used by a prey species to advertise its unprofitability to potential predator species.
water column
water cycle
The non-stop circulation of water on, above, and below Earth's surface. At different times during the cycle, water changes between its different states: liquid, vapor and ice. Also called hydrologic cycle.
water pollution
water stagnation
water vapor
The gaseous state of water.
watershed
The area of land from which rain and melted snow drains downhill into a body of water (i.e. a river, lake, reservoir, estuary, wetland, sea, or ocean).
web of life
The feeding relationships between different species in a given ecosystem. Also called a food chain, food network, or trophic social network.
weed
A plant growing where it is not wanted, often at a high rate of dispersal.
wetland
A type of ecosystem consisting of land permanently or seasonally saturated with water; the habitat of aquatic plants.
wildfire
wildlife
wildlife corridor
A strip of land intended to facilitate the movement of wildlife species between disconnected areas of their habitat.
woodland
A low-density forest.

== X ==
xeric
Extremely dry, as of a landscape or habitat.
xerocole
An animal adapted to life in a desert.
xerophyte
A plant adapted to dry conditions.
xylophagous
Feeding on wood, as of an organism.

== Y ==
yellow rain
A powdery, poisonous, yellow substance reported dropping from the air in the eastern parts of China and Asia and found to be the excrement of wild honeybees contaminated by a fungal toxin.
Sensory Cortex
The sensory cortex includes portions of the cerebral cortex, that wrinkly outer layer of the brain that process and make sense out of information gathered by our five senses: vision, audition (sound), olfaction (smell), gustation (taste), and somatosensation (touch).

== Z ==
zooplankton

== See also ==
- Outline of ecology
- History of ecology
