= March 2015 North India unseasonal rain =

Weather event in India

March 2015 North India Unseasonal Rain and Hailstorm
Meteorological history
- Formed: March 2015

Overall effects
- Fatalities: 80 Farmers Suicide
- Damage: 113 lakh hectares Harvest damaged in 15 states
- Areas affected: North India

The unseasonable rain and hailstorm across all North India and its connected states caused heavy damage to the crops of the Rabi Harvest in March 2015. Usually this period of the year does not get rain but that year heavy rainfall destroyed most of the winter harvest that was near to being cut. It directly affected normal life, especially of farmers who lost their harvest for this season. Due to crop damage on a large scale, the prices of basic food items increased. Approximately 106 lakh hectares harvest was damaged and about 80 farmers attempted suicide in March alone. It was also recorded as the wettest March in 48 years.

== Impact ==
"Usually, from February, western disturbances tend to subside. But this year, not only were the disturbances more active, they extended up to April. Also, there was an induced low pressure, which pulled moisture both from the Bay of Bengal and the Arabian Sea. This led to heavy and frequent showers in March In March, 62.5 millimetres of rainfall were recorded, almost 100 per cent more than normal (32.1 millimetres) and the highest in the past 100 years (in 1915, it was 78 millimetres). The showers and hail, which came at a time when the rabi crop was to be harvested, hit about 10 million hectares of the 60 million hectares of sown area. The standing wheat, mustard and chana crops were hit the hardest. Wheat crop in 21 per cent of the overall sown area has been completely damaged. The estimated loss to an average farmer affected by rains has been Rs 20,000 per acre, but the government has announced a relief of just Rs 6,800 per hectare for rain fed areas."

== Affected states and crops ==
| States | Affected Crops |
|---|---|
| Madhya Pradesh | chickpea, wheat, isabago, mustard, and lentil |
| Maharashtra | rabi, sorghum, citrus, akola, amaravathi, yavatmal, wheat, chickpea, onion, mango, frit |
| Gujarat | wheat, cumin, mango, chickpea affected by 15-30% |
| Telangana | turmeric, safflower, onion, chillies and rabi sorghum |
| Andhra Pradesh | rice, fallow pulses and rabi maize |
| Punjab | wheat on heavy textured soils |
| Karnataka | rabi sorghum (10-15%), chickpea (around 20%), safflower |
| Haryana | wheat and mustard crops |
| Bihar | wheat, oilseeds and pulses affected because of lodging and water logging |
| Jharkhand | oilseeds and pulses |
| Uttar Pradesh | wheat and mustard |
| Assam | Boro rice, mustard, potato and cabbage |
| Meghalaya | Boro rice, mustard, potato, and cabbage |
| Manipur | Boro rice and maize crops |
| Tripura | Boro rice and maize crops |

== Government response ==
The government of India raised the financial compensation for crop damage and made it easier for farmers to claim such compensation after unseasonal rains destroyed standing crops and brought parts of rural India to the brink of crisis. The government decided to increase the amount of compensation to affected farmers by 50 per cent over the existing level and also softened the norms for obtaining assistance.
