= Ecological fitting =

Biological process

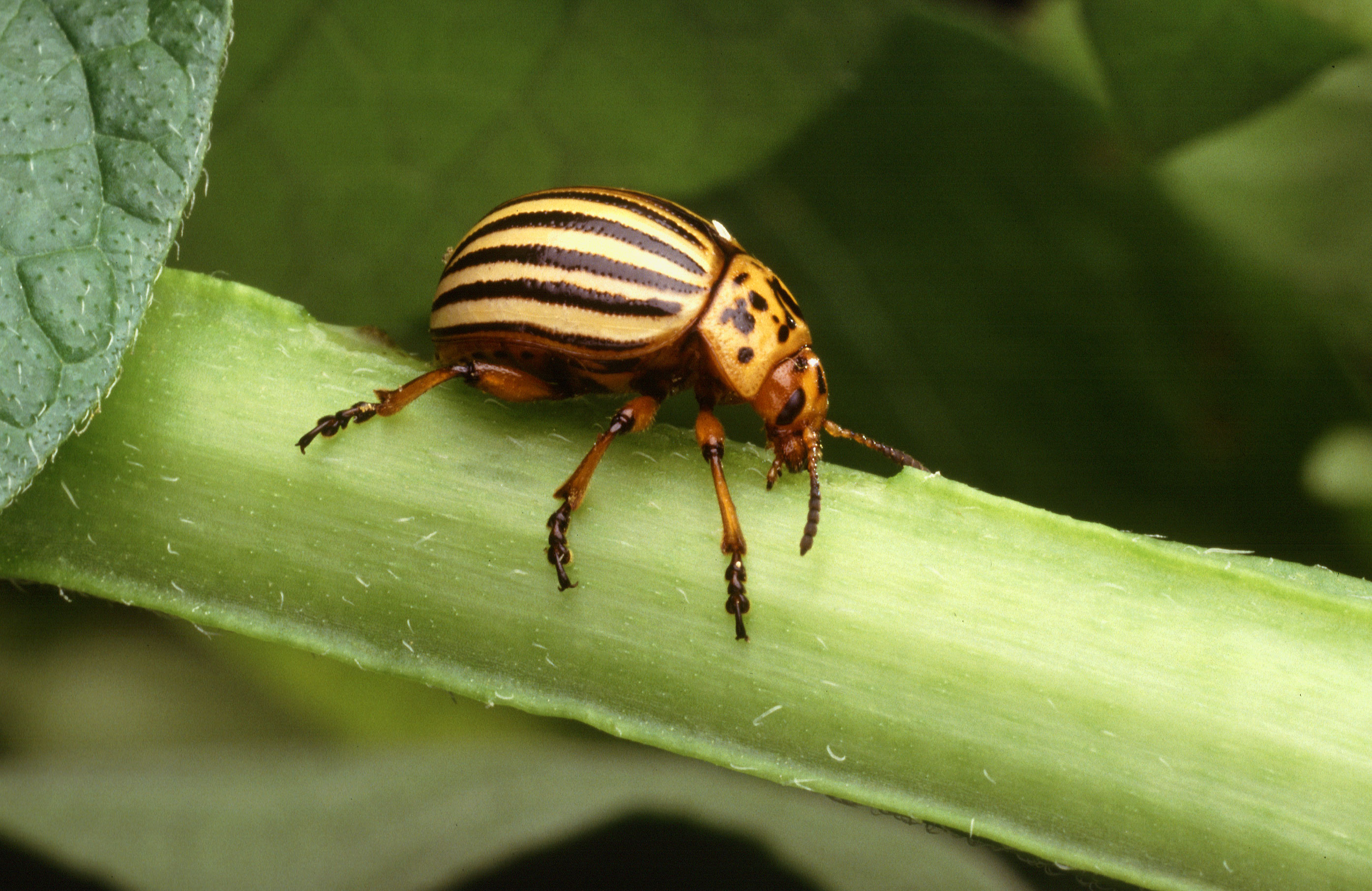
The Colorado potato beetle Leptinotarsa decemlineata readily devours Solanum tuberosum, an introduced relative of its original Solanum hosts, as a result of ecological fitting.

Ecological fitting is "the process whereby organisms colonize and persist in novel environments, use novel resources or form novel associations with other species as a result of the suites of traits that they carry at the time they encounter the novel condition". It can be understood as a situation in which a species' interactions with its biotic and abiotic environment seem to indicate a history of coevolution, when in actuality the relevant traits evolved in response to a different set of biotic and abiotic conditions.

The simplest form of ecological fitting is resource tracking, in which an organism continues to exploit the same resources, but in a new host or environment. In this framework, the organism occupies a multidimensional operative environment defined by the conditions in which it can persist, similar to the idea of the Hutchinsonian niche. In this case, a species can colonize new environments (e.g. an area with the same temperature and water regime), form new species interactions (e.g. a parasite infecting a new host), or both, which can lead to the misinterpretation of the relationship as coevolution, although the organism has not evolved and is continuing to exploit the same resources it always has. The more strict definition of ecological fitting requires that a species encounter an environment or host outside of its original operative environment and obtain realized fitness based on traits developed in previous environments that are now co-opted for a new purpose. This strict form of ecological fitting can also be expressed either as colonization of new habitat or the formation of new species interactions.

Since ecological fitting presupposes the agency of organisms and the choices they make, and therefore their meaning-making, the concept has been generalised as semiotic fitting.

== Origin ==
The evolutionary ecologist Daniel H. Janzen began to explicate the idea of ecological fitting with a 1980 paper that observed that many instances of ecological interactions were inferred to be the result of coevolution when this was not necessarily the case, and encouraged ecologists to use the term coevolution more strictly. He observed that the existing defense traits of plants were likely produced by co-evolution with herbivores or parasites that no longer co-occurred with the plants, but that these traits were continuing to protect the plants against new attacks.

He expanded this idea in a 1985 paper written while visiting Santa Rosa National Park in Costa Rica. While there, he observed that almost all of the species in the park occupied large geographic ranges, and despite the heterogeneity of habitats across these ranges, individuals were mostly identical across locations, indicating that little local adaptation had taken place. He described the cyclical life history pattern he believed responsible for this pattern: a species begins as a small population occupying a small area with little genetic variation, but then over the course of a few generations grows to occupy a large area, either because of the emergence of a genotype successful over a wider range, or because of the removal of a geographic barrier. This large interconnected population is now subject to many contradictory selection pressures and thus remains evolutionarily static until a disturbance separates populations, restarting the cycle.

This cyclic life history pattern is dependent on three premises: that the ancestral range of most species is smaller than the ones now occupied, that biological communities have porous borders and are thus subject to invasion, and that species possess robust genotypes that allow them to colonize new habitats without evolution. Thus, many biological communities may be made up of organisms that despite their complex biological interactions have very little evolutionary history with each other.

== Contrasting views ==
Ecological fitting represents a contrasting view to, and null hypothesis for, the hypothesis that current species interactions are evidence of coevolution. Coevolution occurs when each species in a relationship imposes evolutionary selection on the other(s). Examples could include mutualisms or predator-prey systems. The traditional view of plant–insect, host–parasite, and other tightly associated species, explained by Ehrlich and Raven (1964), defines coevolution as the primary mechanism for these associations. In his 1980 paper, Janzen gives a response to these adaptationist explanations of why a phenotype or species might exist in a particular environment, and expressed his concern with what he perceived as an overuse of coevolutionary explanations for current species associations. He stated that it would be difficult to distinguish between coevolution and ecological fitting, leading ecologists to potentially spurious explanations of current species associations. It is difficult to determine whether a close relationship is the result of coevolution or of ecological fitting because ecological fitting is a sorting process in which only associations that 'fit', or increase fitness (biology), will be maintained. When trying to determine which process is at work in a particular interaction, species can only come into contact through biotic expansion and ecological fitting, followed by adaptation or coevolution. Thus, both processes are important in shaping interactions and communities.

== Mechanisms ==
Ecological fitting can occur by a variety of mechanisms, and can help to explain some ecological phenomena. Resource tracking can help to explain the parasite paradox: that parasites are specialists with narrow environmental ranges, which would encourage host fidelity, yet scientists commonly observe parasite shifts onto novel hosts, both in the phylogenetic record and in ecological time. Ecological fitting can explain the frequency of this phenomenon: similar to the expansion phase of the cyclic life cycle described by Janzen, a species undergoes taxon pulses, usually in a time of ecological disturbance, and expands its range, disperses, and colonizes new areas. For parasite–host, insect–plant, or plant–pollinator associations, this colonization is facilitated by the organism tracking an ancestral resource, and not tracking a particular species. The probability of this is increased when the tracked resource is widespread, or when specialization on a certain resource is a shared trait among distantly related species. This resource tracking has been demonstrated for both insect–plant and parasite–host systems in which sister species are capable of surviving on each other's hosts, even if they were never associated in nature.

When operating under the more strict definition of ecological fitting, in which traits must be exapted for a new purpose, several mechanisms could be operating. Phenotypic plasticity, in which an organism changes phenotype in response to environmental variables, allows for individuals with existing genotypes to obtain fitness in novel conditions without adaptation occurring. Correlated trait evolution can encourage ecological fitting when direct selection on one trait causes a correlated change in another, potentially creating a phenotype that is pre-adapted to possible future conditions. Phylogenetic conservatism is the latent retention of genetic changes from past conditions: for instance, historical exposure to a certain host may predispose it to colonization in the future. Finally, fixed traits such as body size may lead to entirely different biotic interactions in different environments; for example, pollinators visiting different sets of flowers.

== Examples ==
Studies of introduced species can provide some of the best evidence for ecological fitting, because species invasions represent natural experiments testing how a new species fits into a community. Invasion ecology teaches us that changes in geographic range can occur quickly, as is required by the Janzen model for ecological fitting, and ecological fitting provides an important mechanism whereby new species can fit into an existing community without adaptation. These natural experiments have often shown that communities dominated by invasive species, such as those on Ascension Island, can be as diverse and complex as native communities. Additionally, phylogenetic studies show evidence for ecological fitting when lineages of the associated species do not correlate over evolutionary time; that is, if host–parasite or other interactions are as tightly coevolved as was previously believed, parasites should not be switching to unrelated hosts. This kind of host switching has been shown many times: in insect–plant relationships where oligophagy in locusts manifests itself on distantly related plants, plant–disperser relationships among Mediterranean birds, plant–pollinator relationships between hummingbirds and Heliconia flowers, and for parasite–host associations ranging from flatworms in frogs to parasitic worms in primates or in trout. Another study examined the time required for sugarcane, Saccharum officinarum, to accumulate diverse arthropod pest communities. It determined that time did not influence pest species richness, indicating that host–parasite associations were forming in ecological, not evolutionary, time.

The human-made cloud forest on Green Mountain, Ascension Island, represents an example of how unrelated and unassociated plant species can form a functioning ecosystem without a shared evolutionary history. 19th-century accounts of the island, including that of Charles Darwin on his expedition aboard the Beagle, described the rocky island as destitute and bare. Plants were brought to the island by colonists, but the most important change occurred in 1843 with the terraforming of Green Mountain by botanist Joseph Dalton Hooker, who recommended planting trees on Green Mountain and vegetation on the slopes to encourage deeper soils. Plants were regularly sent from England until, in the 1920s, the mountain was green and verdant, and could be described as a functioning cloud forest. Although some of the species likely were introduced together because of their coevolutionary relationships, the overwhelming mechanism governing relationships is clearly ecological fitting. The system has changed dramatically and even provides ecosystem services such as carbon sequestration, all as a result of ecological fitting. This is important with regard to climate change for two reasons: species ranges may be shifting dramatically, and ecological fitting is an important mechanism for the construction of communities over ecological time, and it shows that human-made systems could be integral in the mitigation of climate change.

== Theoretical applications ==
=== Explaining diversity patterns ===
Ecological fitting can influence species diversity either by promoting diversification through genetic drift, or by maintaining evolutionary stasis through gene flow. Research has shown that ecological fitting can result in parasite assemblages that are just as diverse as those produced over evolutionary time, indicating the importance of ecological factors for biodiversity. Ecological fitting can contribute to three types of evolutionary transition. The first is simple ecological fitting, in which organisms track resources to form novel species interactions and increase individual fitness. The second is a shift from an organism's ancestral ecology to a derived ecology, or a more true form of ecological fitting: traits are exapted from their original purpose to increase fitness. Finally, a more dramatic form involves the creation of new evolutionary arenas, requiring morphological or ecological changes to gain fitness under new conditions. Any of these processes can promote speciation or diversification under the right circumstances. Each form of ecological fitting can encourage speciation only if the population is sufficiently isolated from other populations to prevent gene flow from swamping local adaptation to newly formed species associations. Host-plant or other specialized relationships have been previously regarded as an evolutionary 'dead-end' because they seem to limit diversity, but they can actually promote it according to coevolutionary theory. Insects that feed on plants induce them to develop new defense mechanisms, which frees them from herbivory. In this new adaptive zone, or ecospace, plant clades can undergo evolutionary radiation, in which diversification of the clade occurs quickly due to adaptive change. The herbivorous insects may eventually succeed in adapting to the plants' defenses, and would also be capable of diversifying, in the absence of competition by other herbivorous insects. Thus, species associations can lead to rapid diversification of both lineages and contribute to overall community diversity.

Ecological fitting can also maintain populations in stasis, influencing diversity by limiting it. If populations are well-connected through gene flow, local adaptation may not be able to occur (known as antagonistic gene flow), or the well-connected population could evolve as a whole without speciation occurring. The Geographic Mosaic of Coevolution theory can help to explain this: it suggests that coevolution or speciation of a species occurs across a wide geographic scale, rather than at the level of populations, so that populations experiencing selection for a particular trait affect gene frequencies across the geographic region due to gene flow. Populations of a species interact with different species in different parts of its range, so populations may be experiencing a small sub-set of the interactions to which the species as a whole is adapted. This is based on three premises: there is an environmental and biotic interaction mosaic affecting fitness in different areas, there are certain areas where species are more coevolved than others, and that there is mixing of allele frequencies and traits between the regions to produce more homogeneous populations. Thus, depending on connectivity of populations and strength of selection pressure in different arenas, a widespread population can coevolve with another species, or individual populations can specialize, potentially resulting in diversification.

=== Community assembly ===
Ecological fitting can explain aspects of species associations and community assembly, as well as invasion ecology. It is another mechanism, in addition to coevolution and in-situ evolution (in which new phenotypes evolve and travel sympatrically), that can explain the creation and maintenance of species associations within a community. The phenomenon of ecological fitting helps to weigh in on some of the great debates in community ecology. The Clementisian school of community ecology, based on the work of Frederic Clements, a plant ecologist who studied ecological succession, holds that communities are constructed by deterministic processes that assemble a 'superorganism' from the individual species present. With the removal or exchange of a species, the community would be unstable. By contrast, the Gleasonian view, promoted by Henry Gleason, who was also a plant ecologist studying successional communities, is more individualistic and emphasizes the role of random processes such as dispersal in community assembly. The Clementsian view would emphasize coevolution and strict niche fidelity as a major factor structuring communities, also known as the niche-assembly perspective, whereas the Gleasonian, or dispersal assembly view emphasizes neutral and historical processes, including ecological fitting. These views of community assembly prompt questions, such as whether species continue stable relationships over time, or if all individuals represent "asymmetrical pegs in square holes". Some of these questions can be answered through phylogenetic studies, which can determine when certain traits arose, and thus whether species interactions and community assembly occurs primarily through coevolution or through dispersal and ecological fitting. Support exists for each, indicating that each has a varied role to play, depending on the community and on historical factors.

=== Emerging infectious diseases ===
A field of recent importance for the application of ecological fitting is that of emerging infectious disease: infectious diseases that have emerged or increased incidence in the last 20 years, as a result of evolution, range expansion, or ecological changes. Climate change represents an ecological perturbation that induces range and phenological shifts in many species, which can encourage parasite transmission and host switching without any evolutionary change occurring. When species begin to infect host species with which they were not previously associated, it may be the result of ecological fitting. Even organisms with complex life histories can switch hosts as long as the resource required by each life stage is phylogenetically conserved and geographically widespread, meaning that it is difficult to predict based on life history complexity or other external factors. This has been used to explain the mysterious appearance of the bullfrog lung trematode Haematoloechus floedae in Costa Rican leopard frogs, even though bullfrogs do not and have never occurred in this area. When an emerging infectious disease is the result of ecological fitting and host specificity is loose, then recurrent host shifts are likely to occur and the difficult task of building a predictive framework for management is necessary.

== Related terms ==
- Biosemiotics
- Community (ecology)
- Ecosynthesis
- Exaptation
- Janzen–Connell hypothesis
