= Food pyramid =

Food pyramid may refer to:

- Food pyramid (nutrition), one of many pyramid-shaped nutrition guides used around the world
- Food pyramid (food chain), a graphic representation showing the ecological interrelationship between producers and consumers
