= Green Mountain =

Highest point on Ascension Island

Green Mountain, Ascension Island
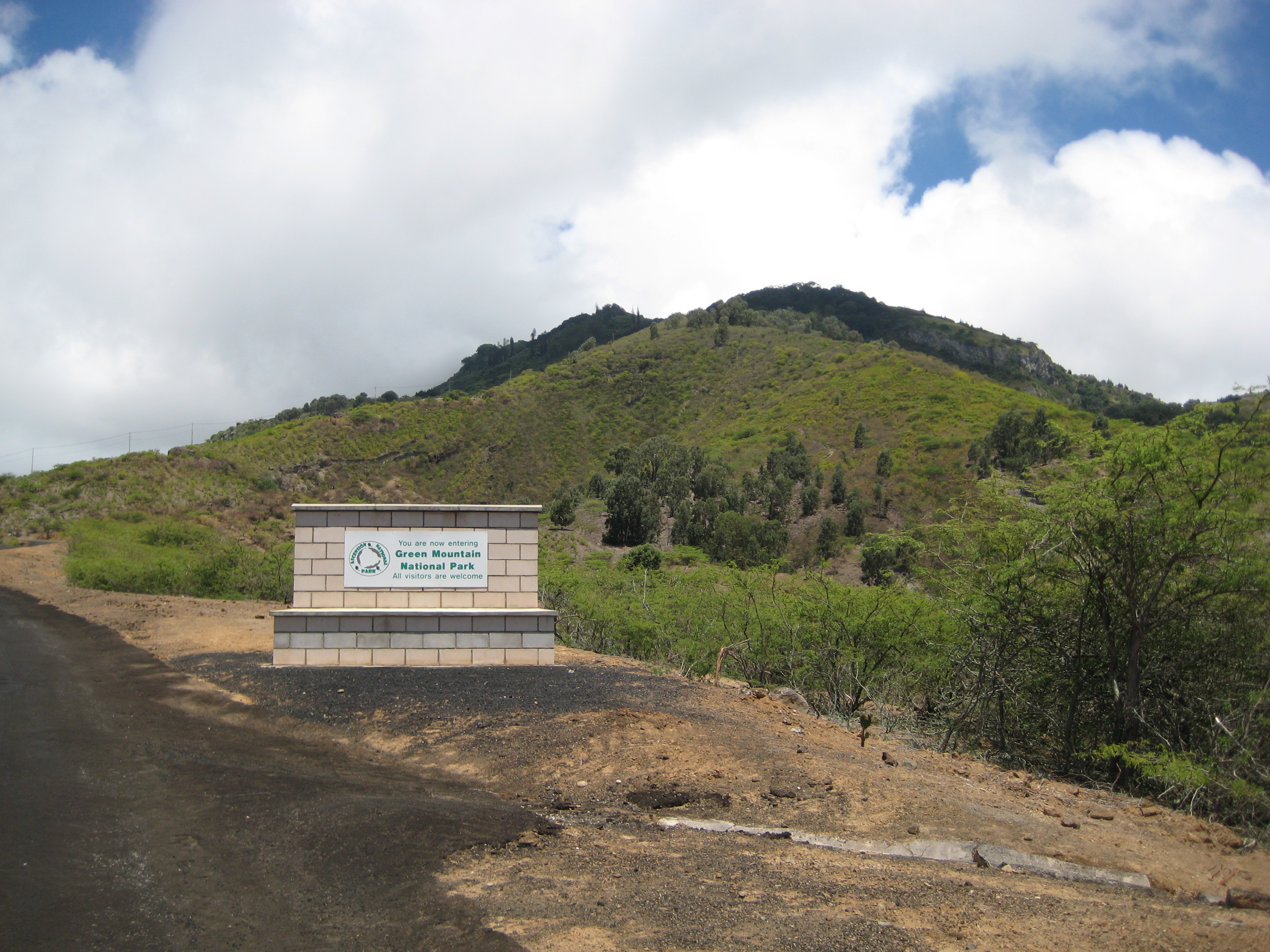
- Entrance to Green Mountain (2011)

Highest point
- Elevation: 859 m (2,818 ft)
- Prominence: 859 m (2,818 ft)
- Coordinates: 7°57′S 14°21′W

Geography
- Location: Ascension Island, South Atlantic Ocean

Geology
- Rock age: Holocene
- Mountain type: Stratovolcano
- Last eruption: Unknown

Climbing
- Easiest route: aircraft, then road, then hike

Green Mountain, or The Peak, is a stratovolcano on Ascension Island. The volcano is the highest point on Ascension Island. It has gained some fame for claims that it is one of very few large-scale artificial forests. Green Mountain is ranked 38th by topographic isolation.

== History and vegetation ==
Many early 19th-century accounts, including Charles Darwin's (July 1836), described the volcanic island as barren with very few plants, some of them endemic to the island, not to be found anywhere else. Scientists estimate the island's native vascular plants to be between 25 and 30 species, 10 of them endemic to Ascension. This impoverished flora is a consequence of the age of the island (only 1 million years old) and isolation (over 1,500 kilometres (930 mi) from any major landmass). In 1843 the British plant collector, Joseph Dalton Hooker, visited the island with Sir James Clark Ross's Antarctica expedition. Hooker proposed a plan to plant the island with vegetation to attempt to increase rainfall and make life more bearable for the garrison that was stationed there. Crucially, he saw the appointment of a farm superintendent as being the key to success.

From that time on, many plants have been introduced, and Hooker's plan can be seen from one angle as an overwhelming success. An 1865 Admiralty report stated on the subject of Green Mountain that "(the island) now possesses thickets of 40 kinds of trees, besides numerous shrubs; through the spreading of vegetation, the water supply is now excellent". By the early 1900s many crops such as bananas and guavas were growing naturally. It is unlikely that this success led to an increase in rainfall, however, but has probably resulted in increased capture of occult deposition (mist) by the greater amount of vegetation.

The resulting cloud forest is a mosaic of plants from a variety of habitats, including woodland, grassland, and shrubland. The ecosystem that has emerged is almost entirely artificial in nature as a result of the interactions between the introduced species from a variety of disparate climates and locations. The resulting ecosystem created by the British introductions has threatened several of the few endemic Ascension island species. Because of this, Green Mountain is now a national park where endemic species are actively conserved.

The mineral dalyite was first found at Green Mountain in 1952.

== Geography and access ==
The Mountain, situated within the national park zone, can be accessed via the main road from Georgetown. However, vehicle access does not extend to the top of the mountain. A footpath exists up to the old barracks and disused water catchment area. This continues to an observation station, where there is also a Dew Pond, formed by the collection of water on top of the mountain. The area is maintained for visitors to a certain extent, and a passage is provided through the dense vegetation. The highest point of the mountain is marked by an anchor chain, which is just up from the Dew Pond.

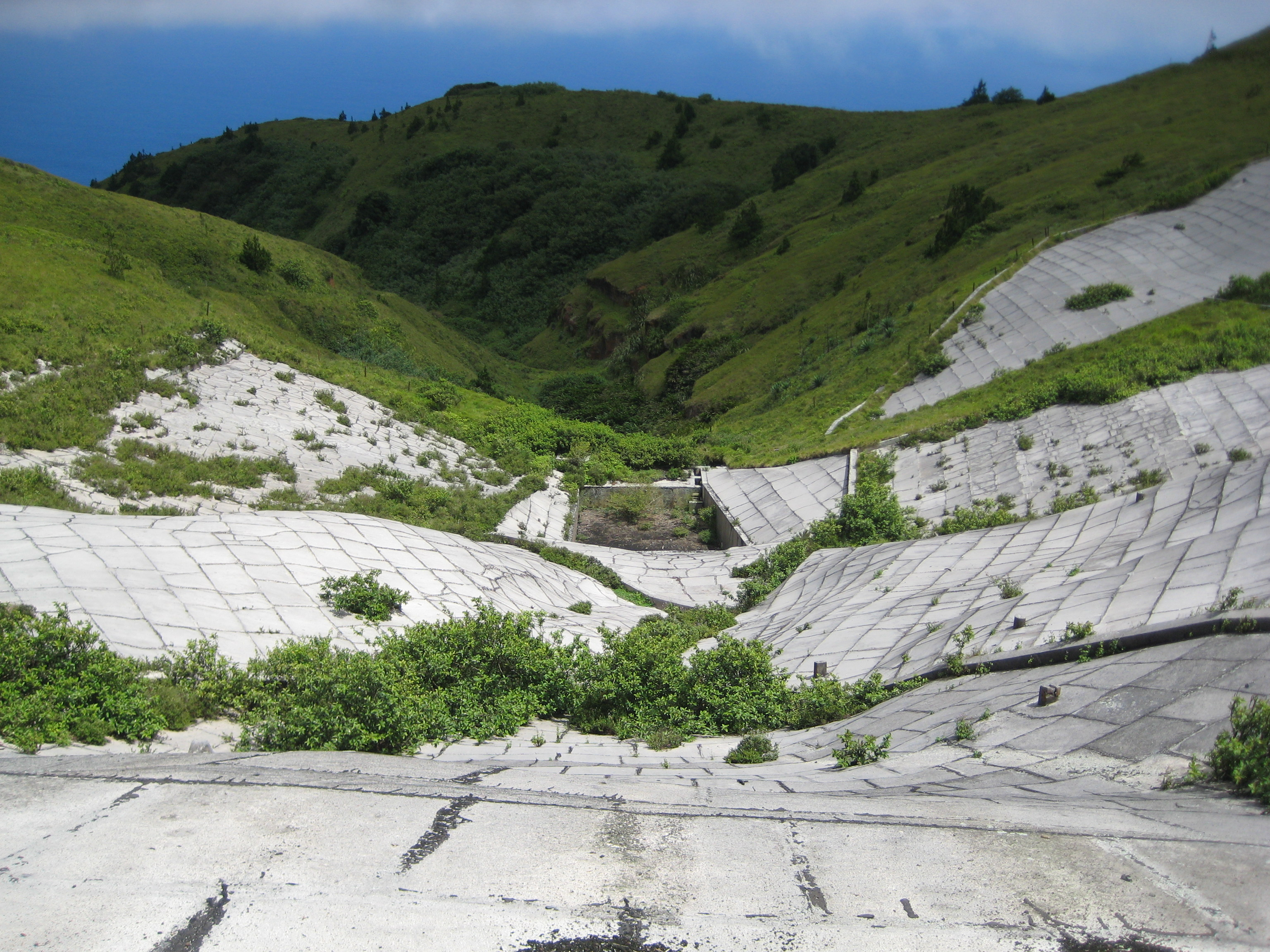
The Old Water Catchment Area, which was once the main supply of water for the island

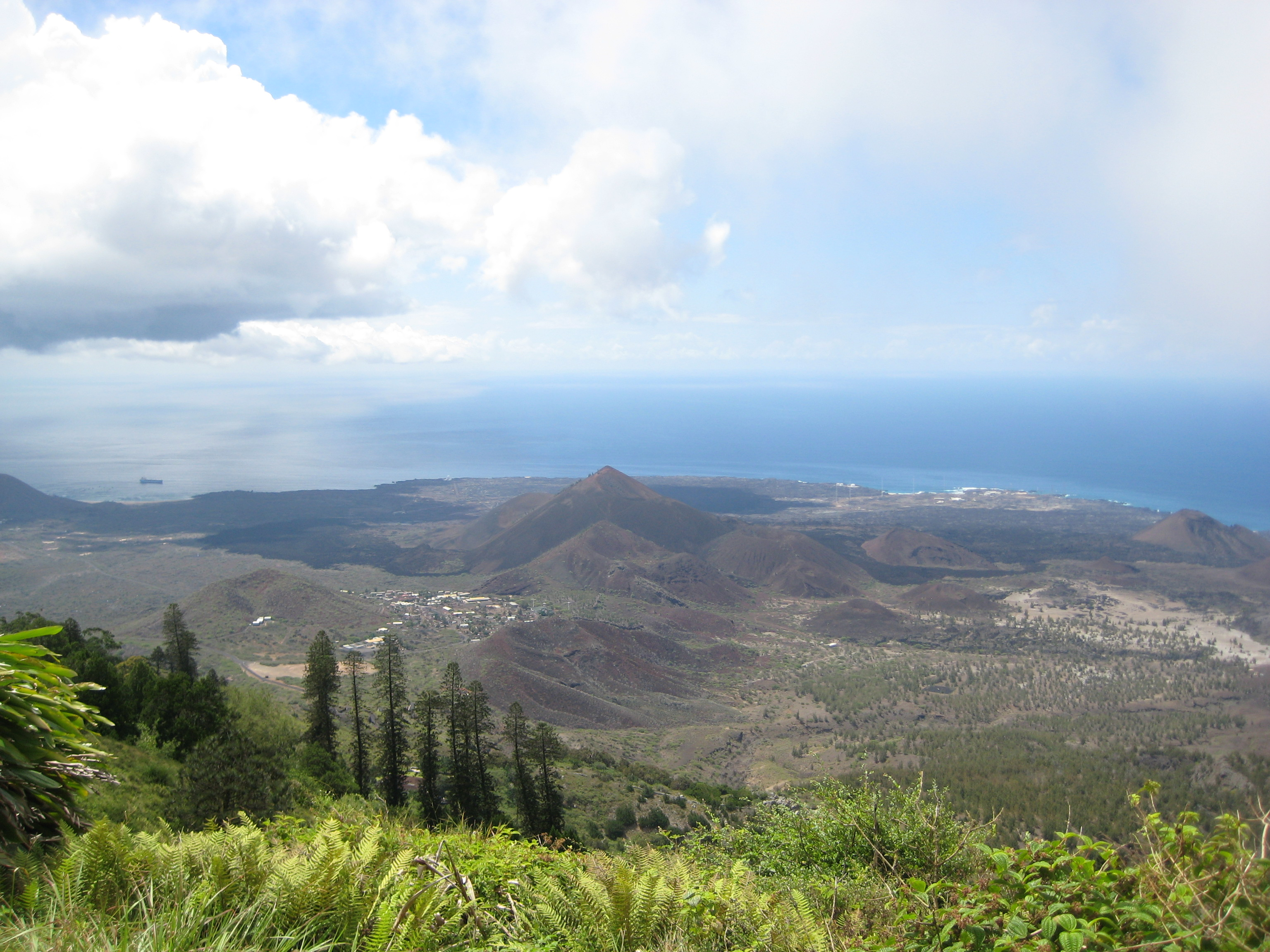
View from atop Green Mountain, showing Ascension Island and the settlement of Two Boats in centre

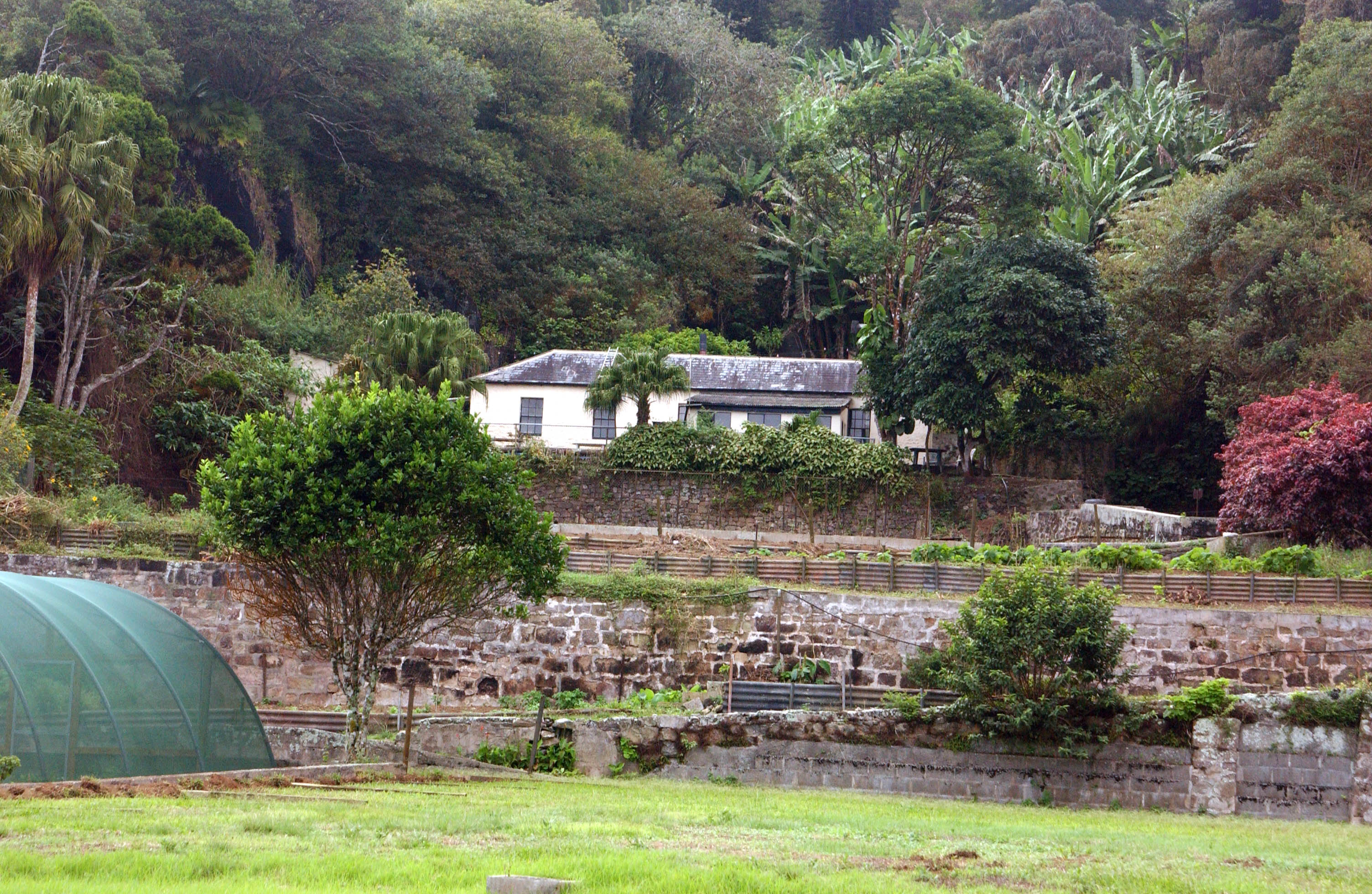
House on the mountain

== See also ==
- Coevolution
- Ecological fitting
- International Mineralogical Association
- List of mountains and hills of Saint Helena, Ascension and Tristan da Cunha
- Terraforming
