= Illegitimate receiver =

An illegitimate receiver is an organism that intercepts another organism's signal, despite not being the signaler's intended target. In animal communication, a signal is any transfer of information from one organism to another, including visual, olfactory (e.g. pheromones), and auditory signals. If the illegitimate receiver's interception of the signal is a means of finding prey, the interception is typically a fitness detriment (meaning that it reduces survival or reproductive ability) to either the signaler or the organism meant to legitimately receive the signal, but it is a fitness advantage to the illegitimate receiver because it provides energy in the form of food. Illegitimate receivers can have important effects on the evolution of communication behaviors.

== Fitness Benefits and Costs ==
=== Fitness Benefits ===
Illegitimate receivers can benefit by intercepting signals to locate prey, or, if they are parasites or parasitoids, by intercepting signals to locate host organisms. In addition to locating prey by intercepting signals given by the prey organism, some animals use the signals of other predators to find carcasses that they can scavenge off of. Other organisms benefit by illegitimately receiving the signals of rivals and using this information to improve their own chances of winning in competition for resources, including mates.

=== Fitness Costs ===
Illegitimate receivers can experience fitness costs if they respond to signals given off by illegitimate signalers, which are organisms that utilize deceptive signals to reduce receiver fitness, typically by preying on or parasitizing the organism that responds. Illegitimate receivers may also experience fitness costs if intercepting signals not intended for them reduces their likelihood of receiving signals that are directed at them, such as the mating calls of members of their own species or the warning calls of rivals.

== Examples ==
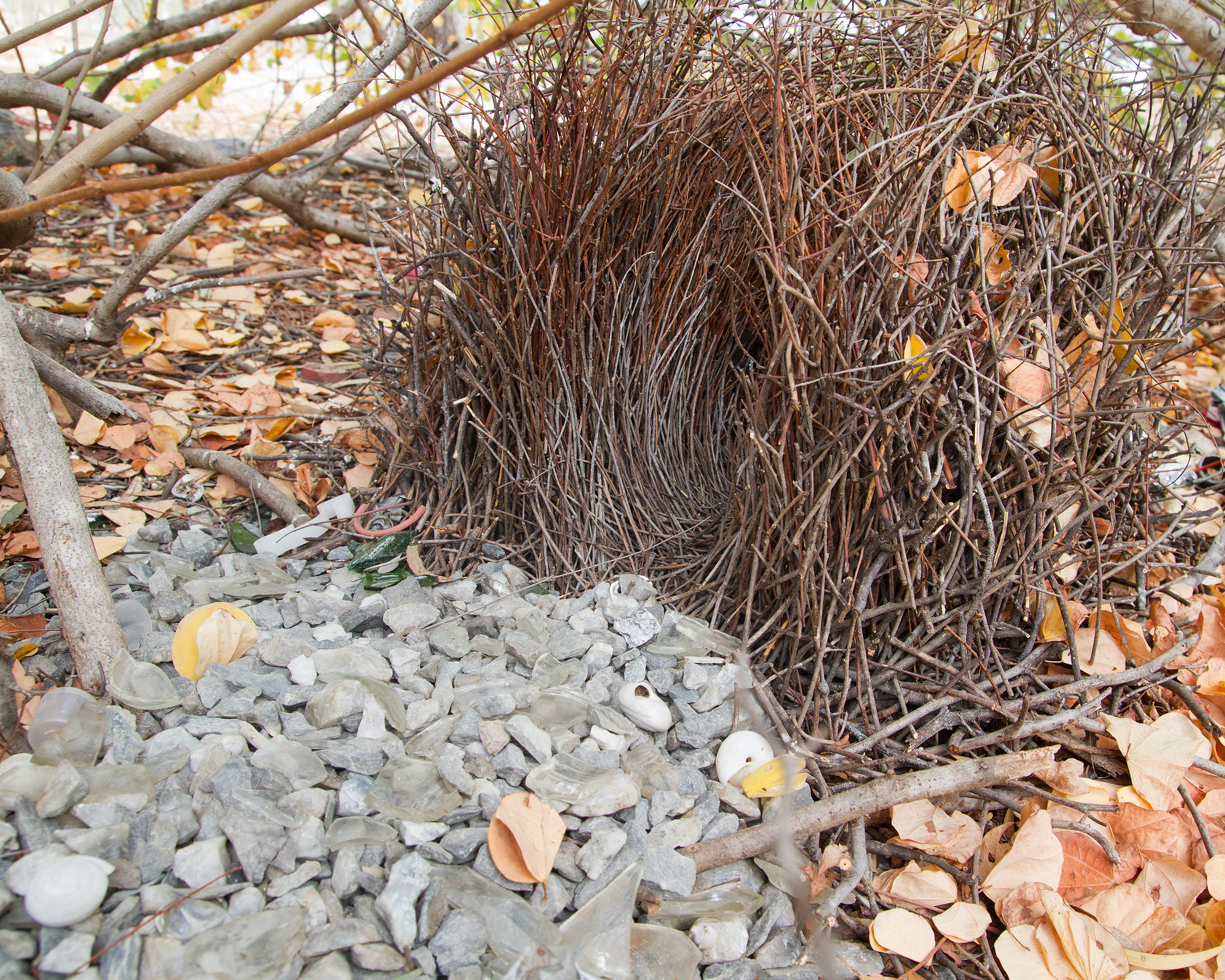
The decorated bower of a great bowerbird.

Redeye bass (Micropterus coosae) and midland water snakes (Nerodia sipedon pleuralis) respond to acoustic and visual signals in male tricolor shiners (Cyprinella trichroistia) when detecting prey.

Male Great Bowerbirds sometimes steal nest decorations, which are intended to attract mates, from their rivals and use these decorations in their own nests.

Male túngara frogs (Physalaemus pustulosus) give off mating calls consisting of both "whines" and "chucks," with songs that contain chucks favored by females over those containing only whines. However, the fringe-lipped bat (Trachops cirrhosus), a natural predator of the túngara frog, is an illegitimate receiver of these songs and uses them to locate its prey. These bats are especially attracted to frog songs containing the chuck element, and so túngara frogs rarely incorporate chucks into their calls. In fact, the frogs have been shown to typically only incorporate the chuck element into their songs when they are congregated in large groups, as this reduces the chance of being eaten via the dilution effect.

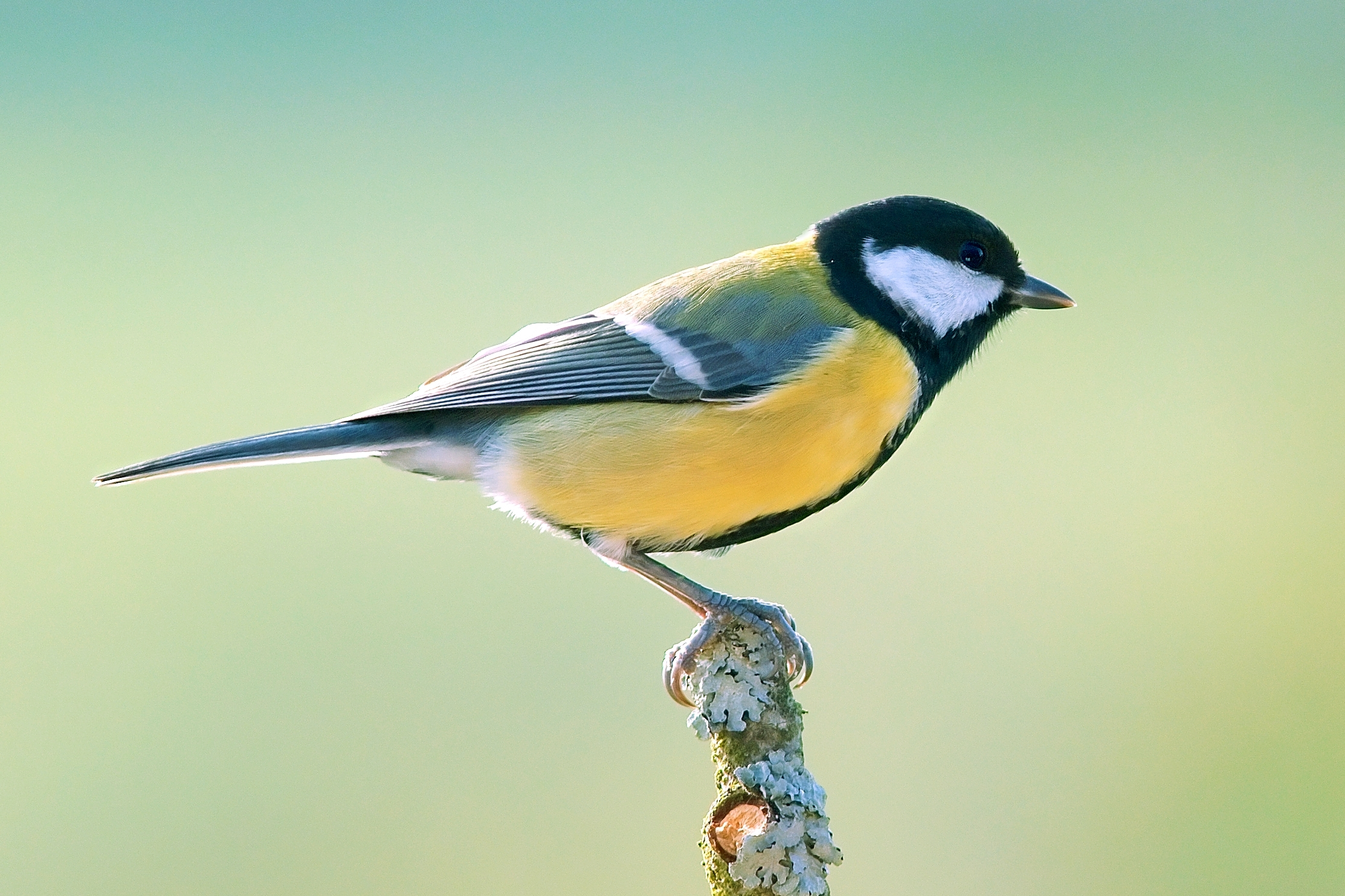
A male great tit.

On the island of Kauai, females of a species of parasitoid fly, Ormia ochracea, respond to the stridulation mating calls of male field crickets (Teleogryllus oceanicus) by locating the crickets and then laying their lethal larvae on them. In response to this, male field crickets have evolved via a "flatwing" mutation to no longer produce mating songs.

Another example of evolution in response to illegitimate receivers is that of the Great tits. These European songbirds have evolved to use "seet" calls in order to avoid having their signals illegitimately received by hawks or owls. Great tits use two different calls to warn one another of nearby predators: When the predators are flying nearby, the great tits use a "seet" alarm call; however, when the predators are perched nearby, the great tits use a mobbing call. The mobbing call is at a much higher frequency than the seet call, allowing for the great tits to recruit nearby individuals of their species when mobbing perched predators in an attempt to chase them out of the area. Meanwhile, the lower frequency of the seet call allows the great tits to warn one another of the danger without attracting the unwanted attention of the mobile hawk or owl. Louder calls are also more frequently exhibited in birds inhabiting more protected habitats, while softer seet calls are more common in unprotected, open areas.

== See also ==
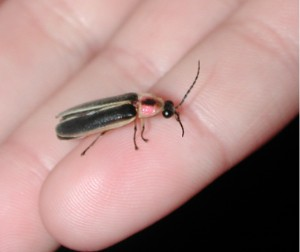
The Photuris firefly.

=== Illegitimate Signalers ===
Illegitimate signalers utilize deceptive signals to reduce the receiver's fitness while increasing their own. Examples include the case of the Photinus and Photuris fireflies, as well as aggressive mimicry.

=== Honest Signals ===
Honest signals are signals used by one organism to convey true information to another individual. An example is the begging calls of bird chicks.

=== Animal Communication ===
Animal communication includes any transfer of information between individuals, including illegitimate receiving and signaling.
