= Microecology =

Microbial ecology or ecology of a microhabitat

Microecology means microbial ecology or ecology of a microhabitat. It is a large field that includes many topics such as: evolution, biodiversity, exobiology, ecology, bioremediation, recycling, and food microbiology. It can also refer to a hybrid urban network at the scale of the neighbourhood. It is the study of the interactions between living organisms and their environment, and how these interactions affect the organisms and their environment. Additionally, it is a multidisciplinary area of study, combining elements of biology, chemistry, physics, mathematics and urban planning. It focuses on the study of the interactions between microorganisms and the environment they inhabit, their effects on the environment, and their effects on other organisms. Microecology also studies the effects of human activity on the environment and how this affects the growth and development of microorganisms or organic structures. Microecology has many applications in the fields of medicine, agriculture, biotechnology and design. It is also important for understanding the cycling of nutrients in the environment, and the behavior of microorganisms or actors in various environments.

In humans, gut microecology is the study of the microbial ecology of the human gut which includes gut microbiota composition, its metabolic activity, and the interactions between the microbiota, the host, and the environment. Research in human gut microecology is important because the microbiome can have profound effects on human health. The microbiome is known to influence the immune system, digestion, and metabolism, and is thought to play a role in a variety of diseases, including diabetes, obesity, inflammatory bowel disease, and cancer. Studying the microbiome can help us better understand these diseases and develop treatments.

Moving onwards, Intestinal microecology is a new area of microecology study. It is a complex microflora that is directly related to human health. Therefore, regulation of intestinal microecology will help in the treatment of many diseases. It was reported that intestinal flora is involved in anti-tumor immunotherapy and affects the curative effect of an anti-malignant tumor therapy to varying degrees.

The activity of metabolites and microbial composition of the intestinal microbiota are associated with various diseases including gastrointestinal diseases and cancer. Similar to the intestinal microecosystem, the vaginal microecosystem is also complicated and plays an important role in women's health. Maintaining microecological balance and the acidic environment of the vagina inhibits the proliferation of pathogenic bacteria.

== Microecology in the Urban Context ==
At the urban scale, the term micro-ecology has been used by Mueller-Wolfertshofer and Boucsein to describe the interdependence and interrelation of various activities within a neighbourhood. The synergy formed through socioeconomic processes, often with collaboration, profits all the actors involved and improves conditions, not just in the immediate neighbourhood, but at times even the city they are part of.
