= Ecosynthesis =

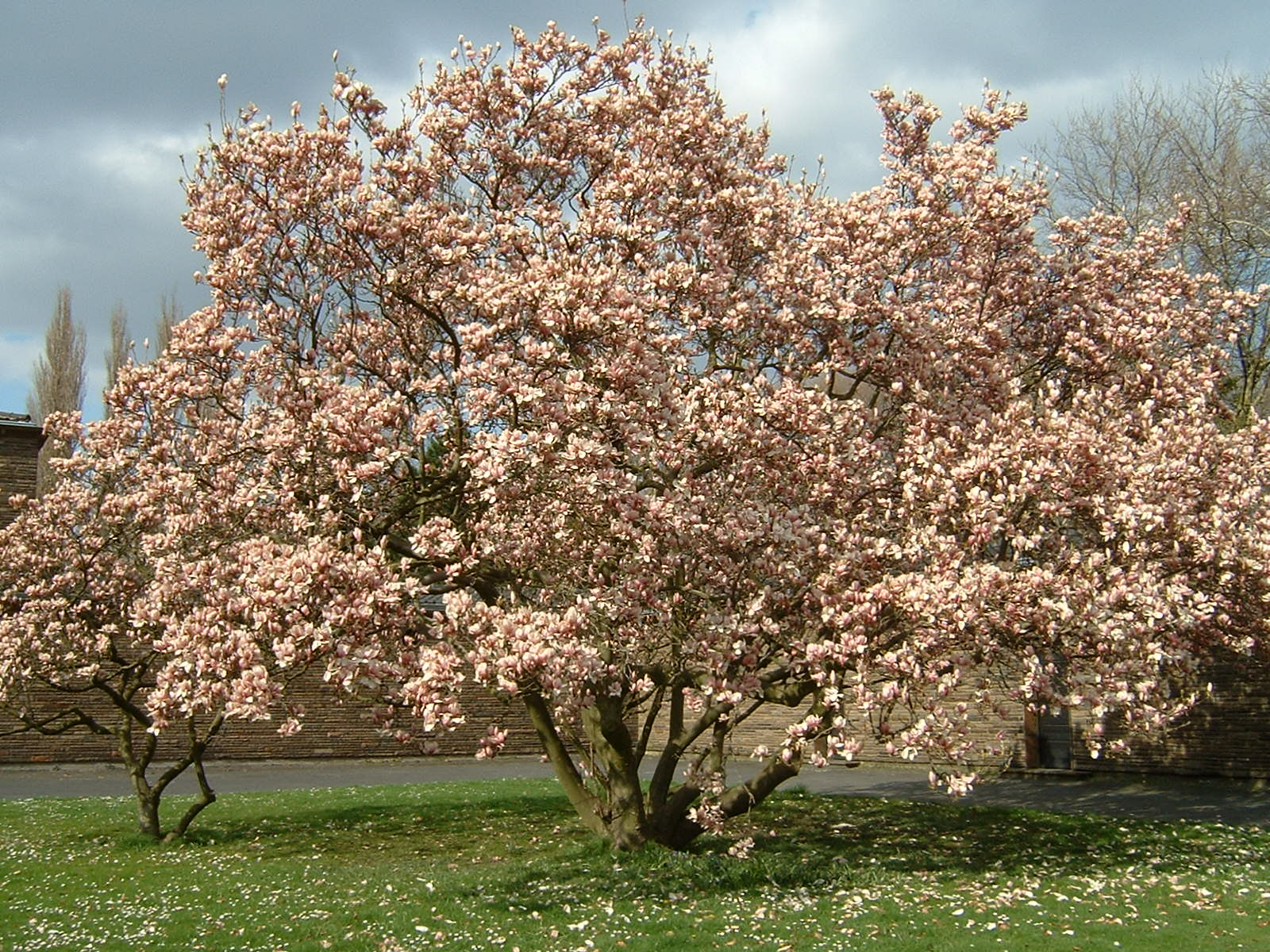
Magnolia tree, as an introduced species in a disturbed environment

Ecosynthesis is the use of introduced species to fill niches in a disrupted environment, with the aim of increasing the speed of ecological restoration. This decreases the amount of physical damage done in a disrupted landscape. An example is using willow in a stream corridor for sediment and phosphorus capture. It aims to aid ecological restoration, the practice of renewing and restoring degraded, damaged, or destroyed ecosystems and habitats in the environment by active human intervention and action. Humans use ecosynthesis to make environments more suitable for life, through restoration ecology (introduced species, vegetation mapping, habitat enhancement, remediation and mitigation.)

== Restoration ecology ==
Ecological restoration aims to recreate, initiate, or accelerate the recovery of an ecosystem that has been disturbed.

Revegetation: the establishment of vegetation on sites where it has been previously lost, often with erosion control as the primary goal.

Habitat enhancement: the process of increasing the suitability of a site as habitat for some desired species.

Remediation: improving an existing ecosystem or creating a new one with the aim of replacing another that has deteriorated or been destroyed.

Mitigation: legally mandated remediation for loss of protected species or an ecosystem.

Through restoration ecology, humans can help ecosystems that we have either caused harm to or disturbed be brought back to functional state.

== Trophic cascade ==
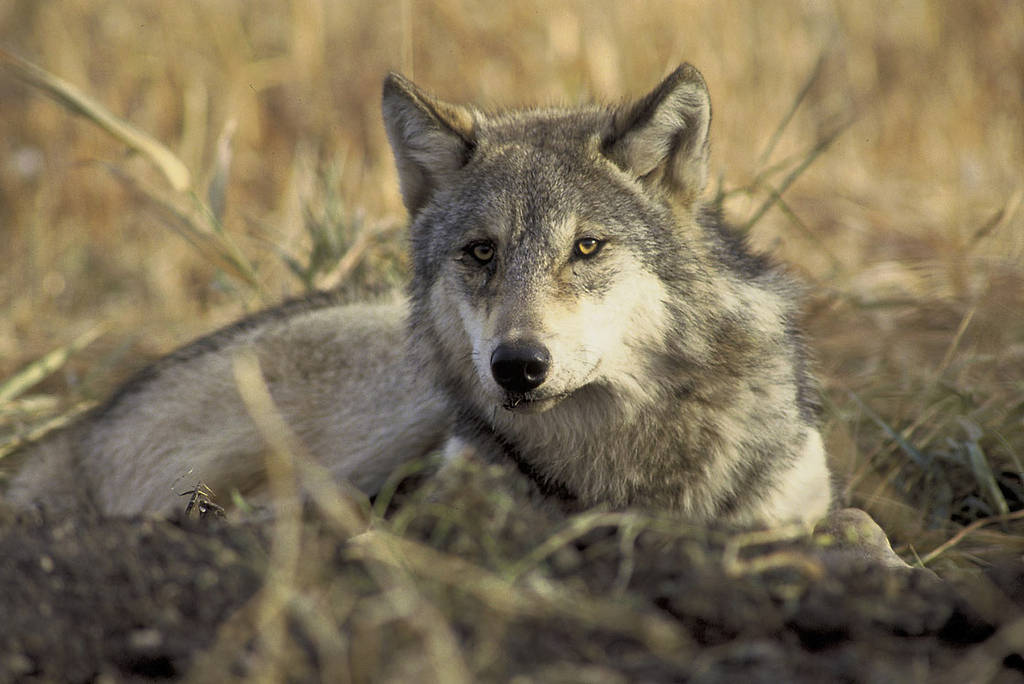
Gray wolf in YellowStone National Park

A clear example of humans ecosynthesiszing would be through the introduction of a species to cause a trophic cascade, which is the result of indirect effects between nonadjacent trophic levels in a food chain or food web, such as the top predator in a food chain and a plant. The most famous example of a trophic cascade is that of the introduction of wolves to Yellowstone National Park, which had extradionary effects to the ecosystem. Yellowstone had a massive population of elk because they had no predators, which caused the local aspen population and other vegetation to significantly decrease in population size. However, the introduction of wolves controlled the elk population and indirectly affected the aspen and other vegetation, bringing the ecosystem back to sustainability.

== See also ==
- Ecopoiesis
