= Standing crop =

A standing crop is the total biomass of the living organisms present in a given environment. This includes both natural ecosystems and agriculture.

== See also ==
- Net Primary Production
- Standing State

== Bibliography ==
- Ackley, S. F.; Buck, K. R.; Taguchi, S. (1979). "Standing crop of algae in the sea ice of the Weddell Sea region". Deep-Sea Research Part A: Oceanographic Research Papers. 26 (3): 269–281. Bibcode:1979DSRA...26..269A. doi:10.1016/0198-0149(79)90024-4.
- Boudouresque CF (1973) Les peuplements sciaphiles; Recherches de bionomie analytique, structurale et expérimentale sur les peuplements benthiques sciaphiles de Méditerranée occidentale (fraction algale). Bulletin du Muséum d'histoire naturelle, 33, 147, PDF, 80 pages.
- Campbell, Reece, Urry, Cain, et al. (2011) 9th ed. Biology. Benjamin Cummings. pg 1221
- Fausch, K. D., Hawkes, C. L., & Parsons, M. G. (1988). Models that predict standing crop of stream fish from habitat variables: 1950-85 (http://www.treesearch.fs.fed.us/pubs/8730 résumé]).
- Hatcher, B. G.; Larkum, A. W. D. (1983). "An experimental analysis of factors controlling the standing crop of the epilithic algal community on a coral reef". Journal of Experimental Marine Biology and Ecology. 69 (1): 61–84. Bibcode:1983JEMBE..69...61H. doi:10.1016/0022-0981(83)90172-7.
- Jenkins, R. M. (1968). The influence of some environmental factors on standing crop and harvest of fishes in US reservoirs.
- Moore, D. R.; Keddy, P. A. (1988). "The relationship between species richness and standing crop in wetlands: the importance of scale". Vegetatio. 79 (1–2): 99–106. doi:10.1007/BF00044853. S2CID 2448402.
- Oglesby, R. T. (1977). "Relationships of fish yield to lake phytoplankton standing crop, production, and morphoedaphic factors". Journal of the Fisheries Board of Canada. 34 (12): 2271–2279. doi:10.1139/f77-305.
- Schindler, D. W. (1978). "Factors regulating phytoplankton production and standing crop in the world's freshwaters" (PDF). Limnol. Oceanogr. 23 (3): 478–486. Bibcode:1978LimOc..23..478S. doi:10.4319/lo.1978.23.3.0478.
- Schindler, D. W.; Fee, E. J.; Ruszczynski, T. (1978). "Phosphorus input and its consequences for phytoplankton standing crop and production in the Experimental Lakes Area and in similar lakes". Journal of the Fisheries Board of Canada. 35 (2): 190–196. doi:10.1139/f78-031.
- Williams, R. B.; Murdoch, M. B.; Thomas, L. K. (1968). "Standing crop and importance of zooplankton in a system of shallow estuaries". Chesapeake Science. 9 (1): 42–51. Bibcode:1968CpkSc...9...42W. doi:10.2307/1351282. JSTOR 1351282.
