= Geneticist =

Biologist who studies genes and genetic technologies and processes

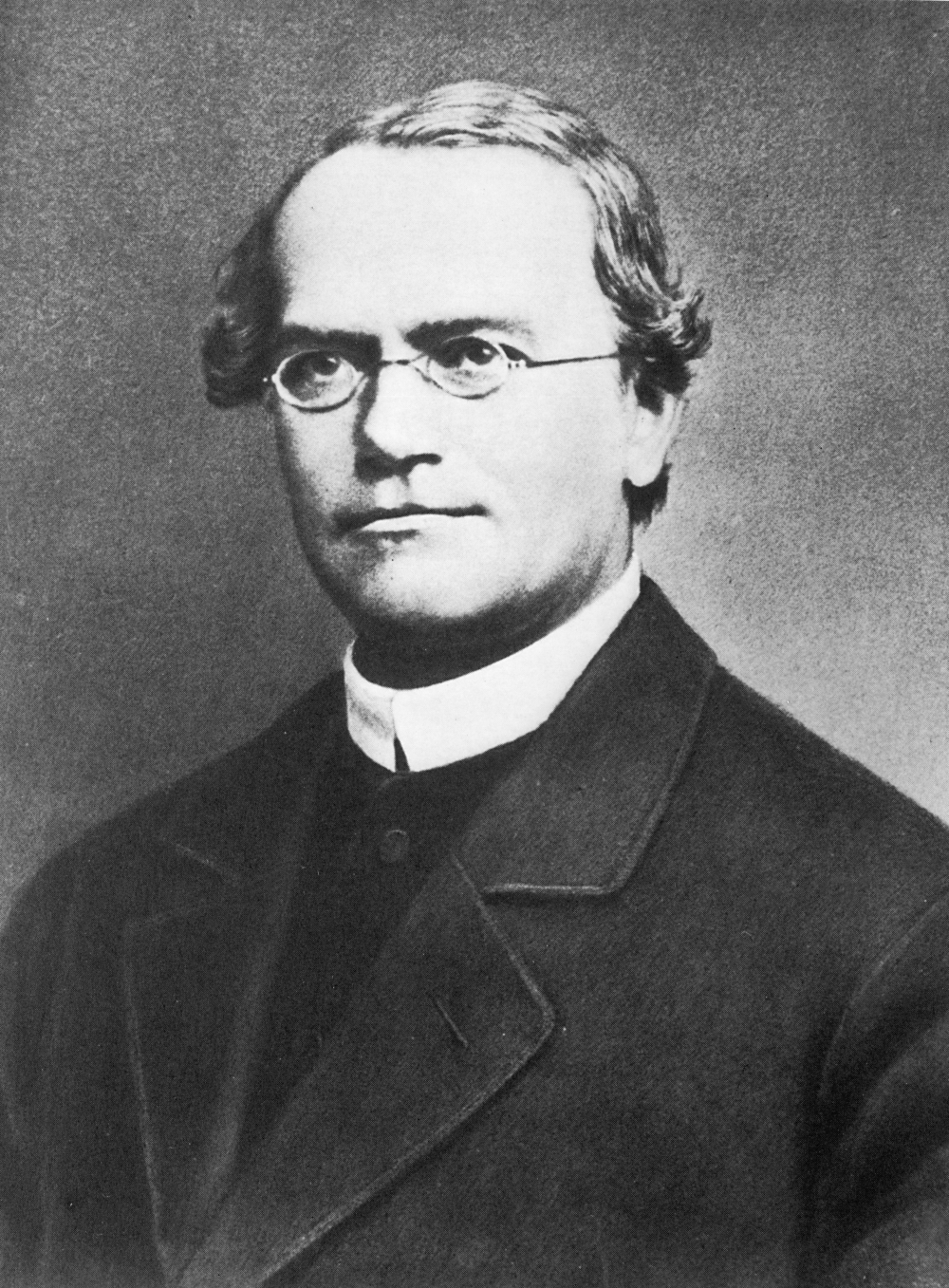
Gregor Mendel is often known as the "father of modern genetics."

A geneticist is a biologist or physician who studies genetics, the science of genes, heredity, and variation of organisms. A geneticist can be employed as a scientist or a lecturer. Geneticists may perform general research on genetic processes or develop genetic technologies to aid in the pharmaceutical or and agriculture industries. Some geneticists perform experiments in model organisms such as Drosophila, C. elegans, zebrafish, rodents or humans and analyze data to interpret the inheritance of biological traits. A basic science geneticist is a scientist who usually has earned a PhD in genetics and undertakes research and/or lectures in the field. A medical geneticist is a physician who has been trained in medical genetics as a specialization and evaluates, diagnoses, and manages patients with hereditary conditions or congenital malformations; and provides genetic risk calculations and mutation analysis.

== Education ==
Geneticists participate in courses from many areas, such as biology, chemistry, physics, microbiology, cell biology, bioinformatics, and mathematics. They also participate in more specifie genetics courses such as molecular genetics, transmission genetics, population genetics, quantitative genetics, ecological genetics, epigenetics, and genomics.

== Careers ==
Geneticists can work in many different fields, doing a variety of jobs. There are many careers for geneticists in medicine, agriculture, wildlife, general sciences, or many other fields.

Listed below are a few examples of careers a geneticist may pursue.

- Research and development
- Genetic counseling
- Clinical research
- Medical genetics
- Gene therapy
- Pharmacogenomics
- Molecular ecology
- Animal breeding
- Genomics
- Biotechnology
- Proteomics
- Microbial genetics
- Teaching
- Molecular diagnostics
- Sales and marketing for scientific products
- Science journalism
- Patent law
- Paternity testing
- Forensic DNA
- Agriculture
