= Wildlife species =

Wildlife species may refer to:

- A taxonomic species found in the wild
- Evolutionarily Significant Unit, a grouping used in conservation that may refer to species, subspecies, or other groups
