= Genetic monitoring =

Genetic monitoring is the use of molecular markers to (i) identify individuals, species or populations, or (ii) to quantify changes in population genetic metrics (such as effective population size, genetic diversity and population size) over time. Genetic monitoring can thus be used to detect changes in species abundance and/or diversity, and has become an important tool in both conservation and livestock management. The types of molecular markers used to monitor populations are most commonly mitochondrial, microsatellites or single-nucleotide polymorphisms (SNPs), while earlier studies also used allozyme data. Species gene diversity is also recognized as an important biodiversity metric for implementation of the Convention on Biological Diversity.

== Types ==
Types of population changes that can be detected by genetic monitoring include population growth and decline, spread of pathogens, adaptation to environmental change, hybridization, introgression and habitat fragmentation events. Most of these changes are monitored using ‘neutral’ genetic markers (markers for which mutational changes do not change their adaptive fitness within a population). However markers showing adaptive responses to environmental change can be ‘non-neutral’ (e.g. mutational changes affect their relative fitness within a population).

Categories of Genetic Monitoring as defined by Schwartz et al. 2007

Two broad categories of genetic monitoring have been defined: Category I encompasses the use of genetic markers as identifiers of individuals (Category Ia), populations and species (Category Ib) for traditional population monitoring. Category II represents the use of genetic markers to monitor changes of population genetic parameters, which include estimators of effective population size (Ne), genetic variation, population inter-mixing, structure and migration.

== Examples ==
=== Estimating abundance and life history parameters – Category Ia ===
At the individual level, genetic identification can enable estimation of population abundance and population increase rates within the framework of mark-recapture models. The abundance of cryptic or elusive species that are difficult to monitor can be estimated by collecting non-invasive biological samples in the field (e.g. feathers, scat or fur) and using these to identify individuals through microsatellite or single-nucleotide polymorphism (SNP) genotyping. This census of individuals can then be used to estimate population abundance via mark-recapture analysis. For example, this technique has been used to monitor populations of grizzly bear, brush-tailed rock-wallaby, Bengal tiger and snow leopard. Population growth rates are a product of rates of population recruitment and survival, and can be estimated through open mark-recapture models. For example, DNA from feathers shed by the eastern imperial eagle shows lower cumulative survival over time than seen for other long-lived raptors.

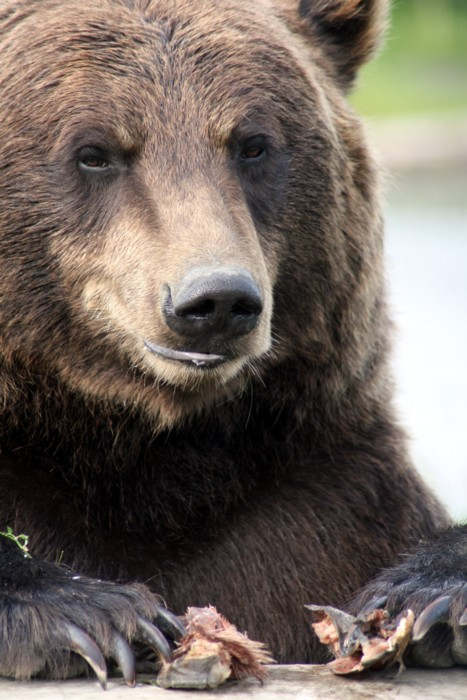
Grizzly bear

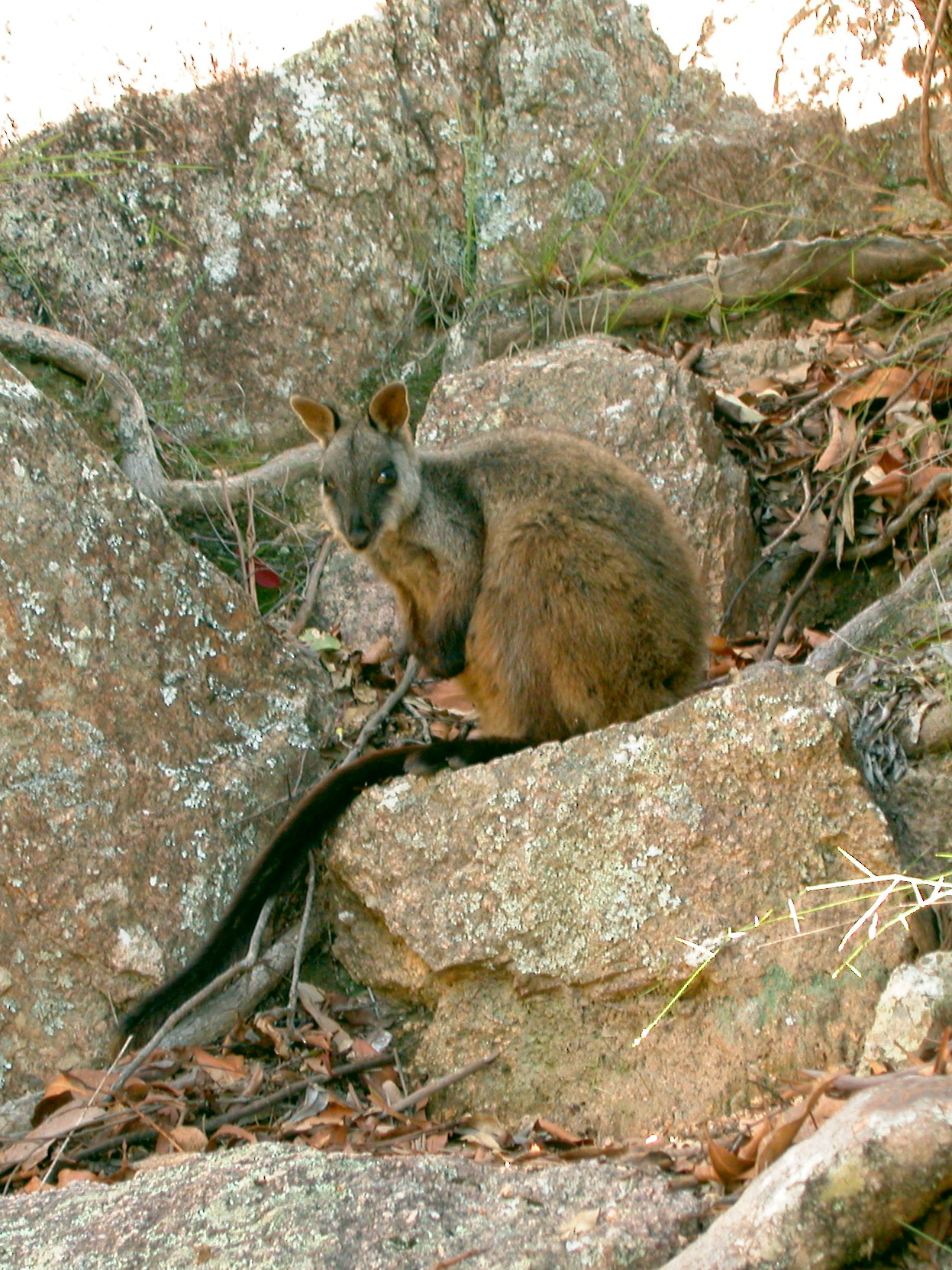
Brush-tailed rock-wallaby

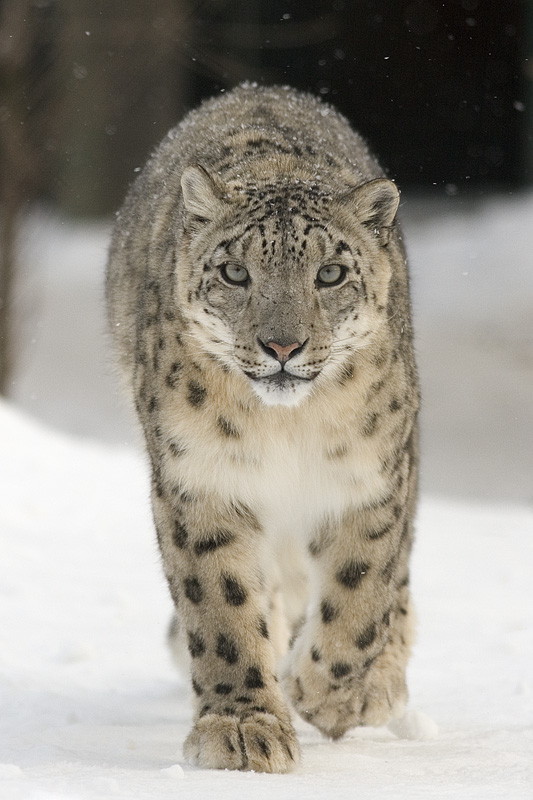
Snow leopard

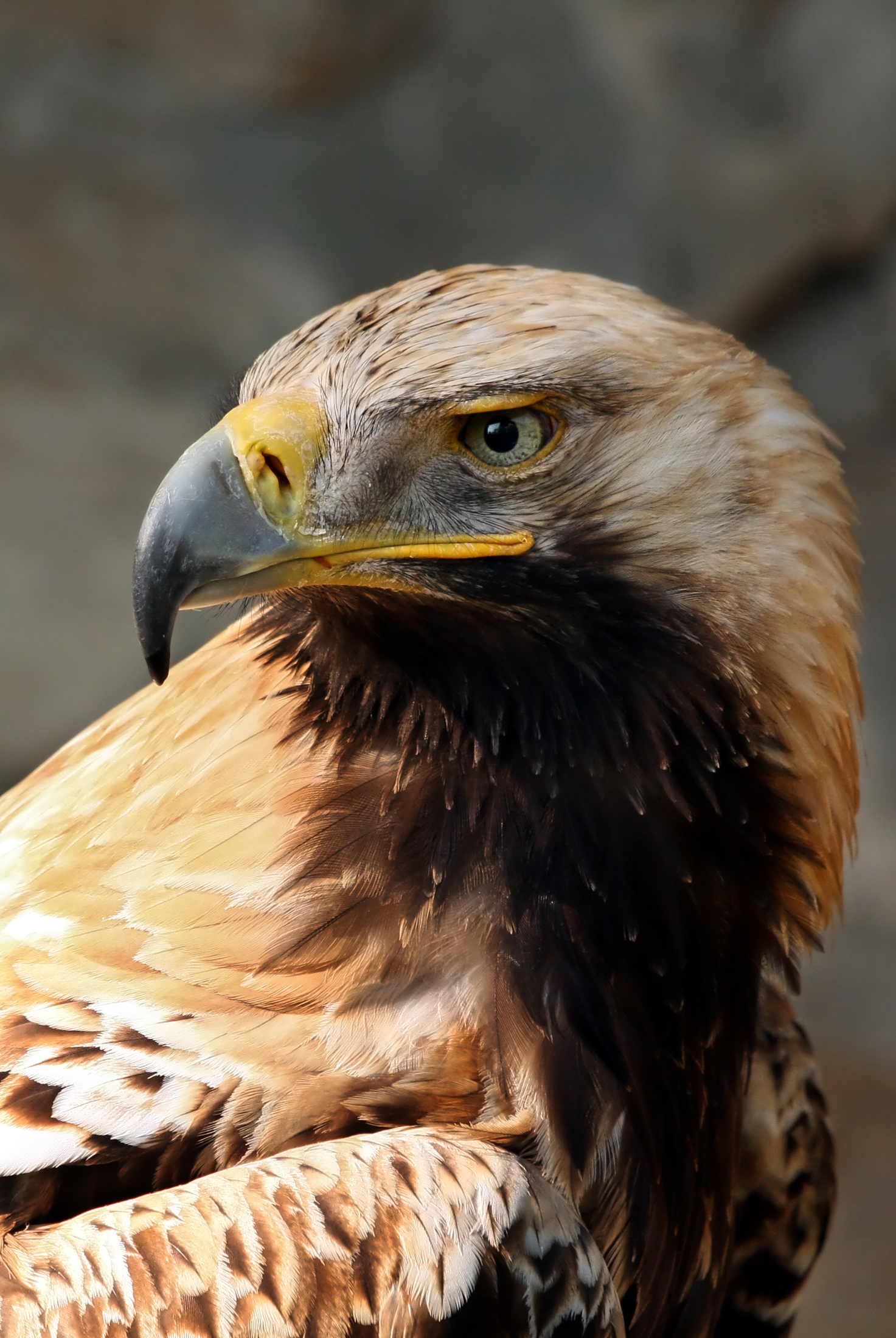
Eastern imperial eagle

=== Identifying species – Category Ib ===
Use of molecular genetic techniques to identify species can be useful for a number of reasons. Species identification in the wild can be used to detect changes in population ranges or site occupancy, rates of hybridization and the emergence and spread of pathogens and invasive species. Changes in population ranges have been investigated for Iberian lynx and wolverine, while monitoring of westslope cutthroat trout shows widespread ongoing hybridization with introduced rainbow trout (see cutbow) and Canada lynx-bobcat hybrids have been detected at the southern periphery of the current population range for lynx. The emergence and spread of pathogens can be tracked using diagnostic molecular assays – for example, identifying the spread of West Nile virus among mosquitoes in the eastern US to identify likely geographical origins of infection and identifying gene loci associated with parasite susceptibility in bighorn sheep. Genetic monitoring of invasive species is of conservation and economic interest, as invasions often affect the ecology and range of native species and may also bring risks of hybridization (e.g. for copepods, ducks, barred owl and spotted owl, and Lessepsian rabbitfish).

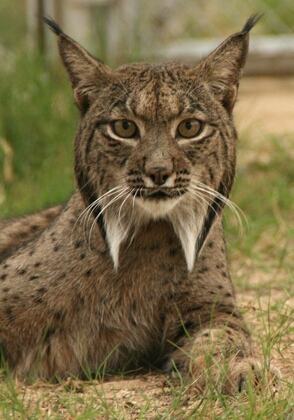
Iberian lynx

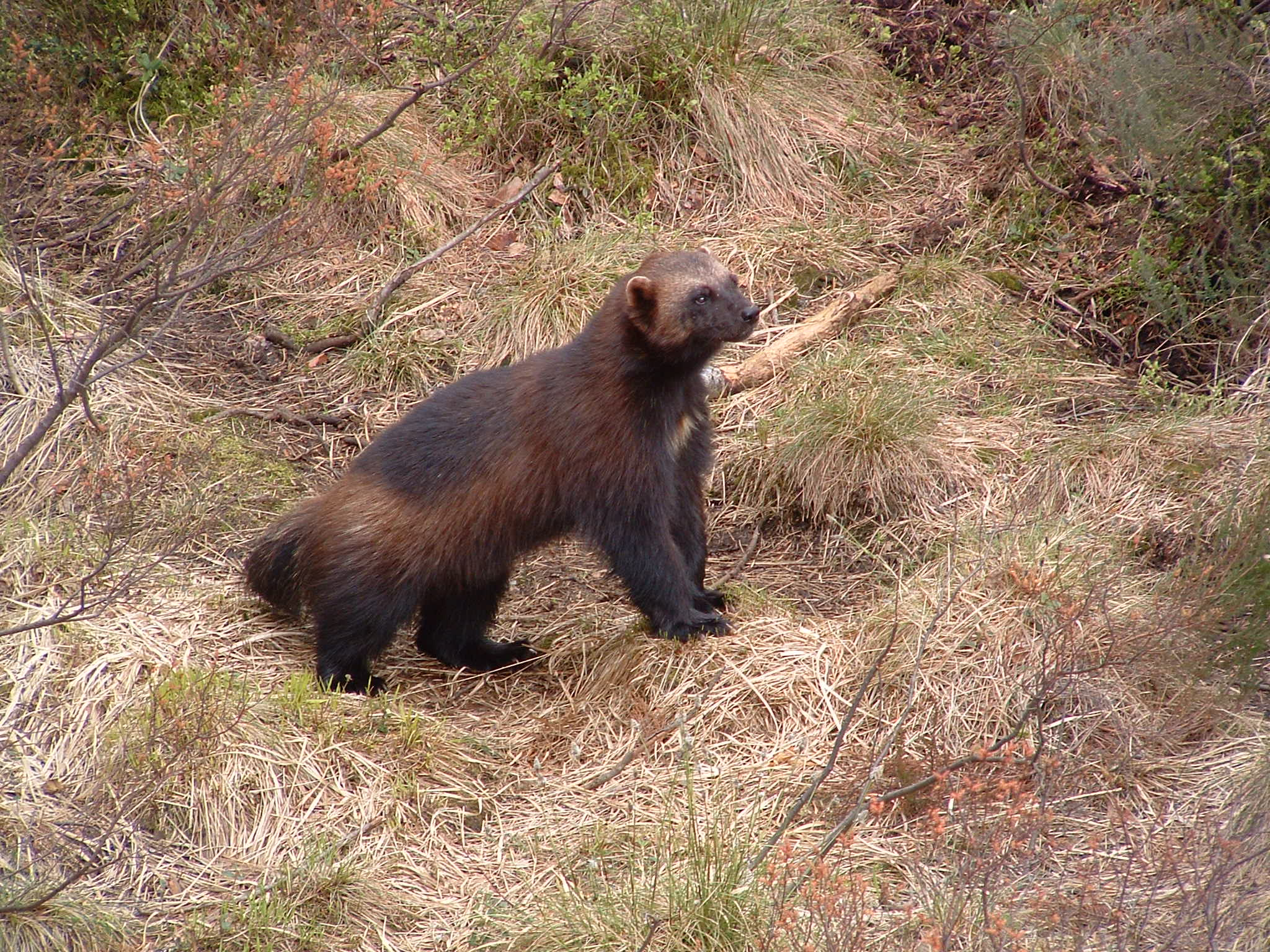
Wolverine

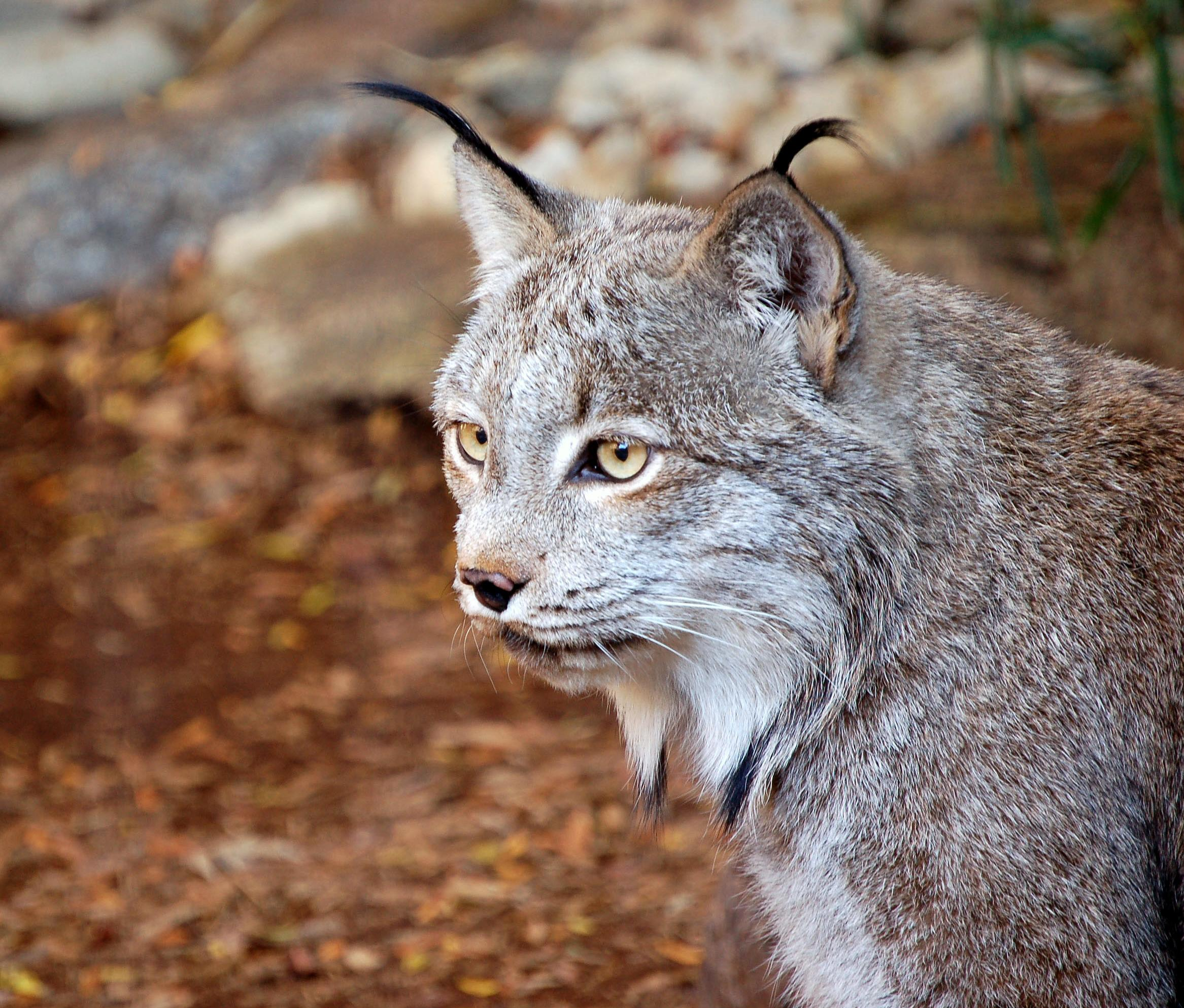
Canadian lynx

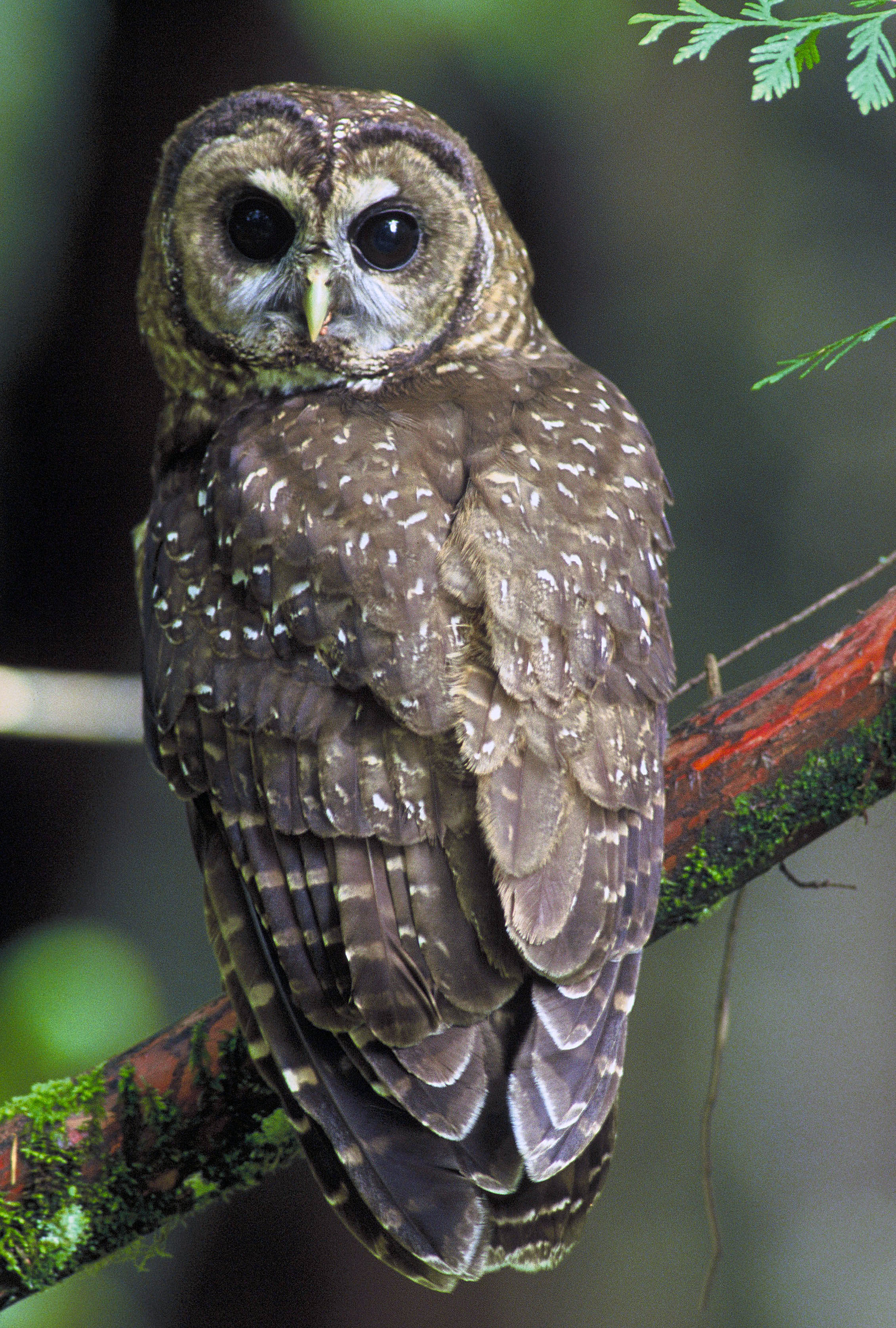
Spotted owl

Species identification is also of considerable utility in monitoring fisheries and wildlife trade, where conventional visual identification of butchered or flensed products is difficult or impossible. Monitoring of trade and consumption of species of conservation interest can be carried out using molecular amplification and identification of meat or fish obtained from markets. For example, genetic market surveys have been used to identify protected species and populations of whale (e.g., North Pacific minke whale) and dolphin species appearing in the marketplace. Other surveys of market trade have focused on pinnipeds, sea horses and sharks. Such surveys are used to provide ongoing monitoring of the quantity and movement of fisheries and wildlife products through markets and for detecting poaching or other illegal, unreported or unregulated (IUU) exploitation (e.g. IUU fishing).

Although initial applications focused on species identification and population assessments, market surveys also provide the opportunity for a range of molecular ecology investigations including capture-recapture, assignment tests and population modeling. These developments are potentially relevant to genetic monitoring Category II.

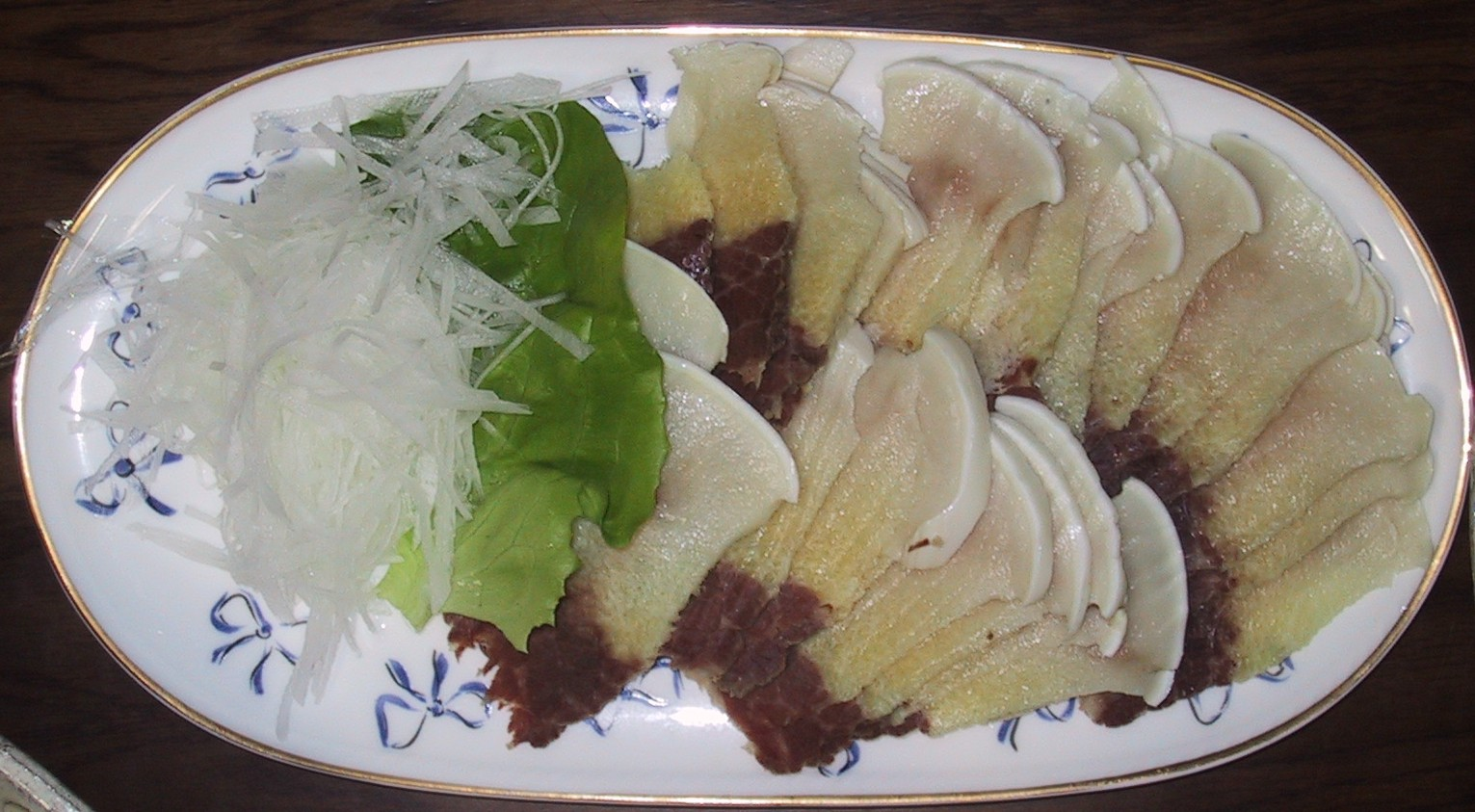
Whale meat

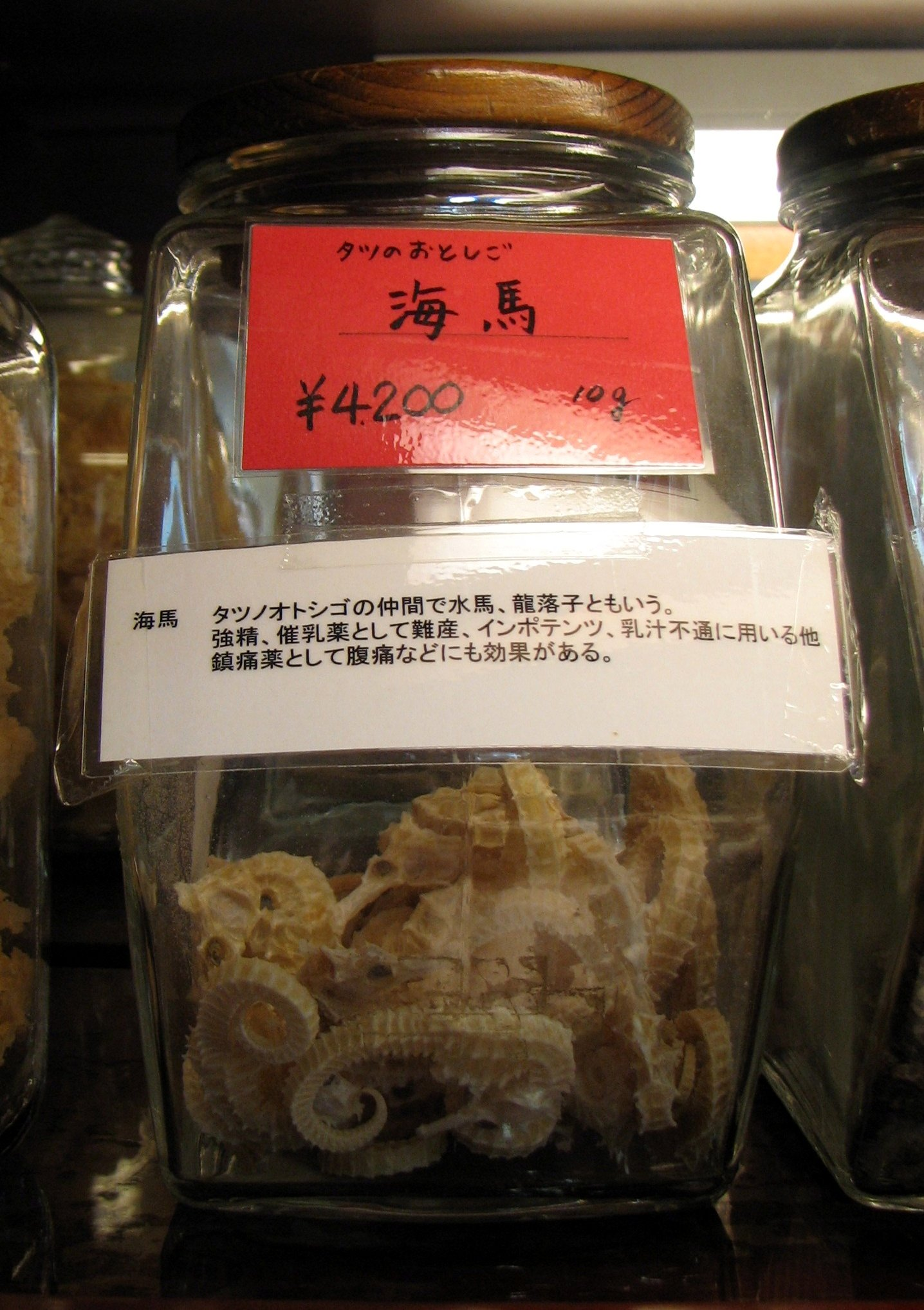
Dried sea horses

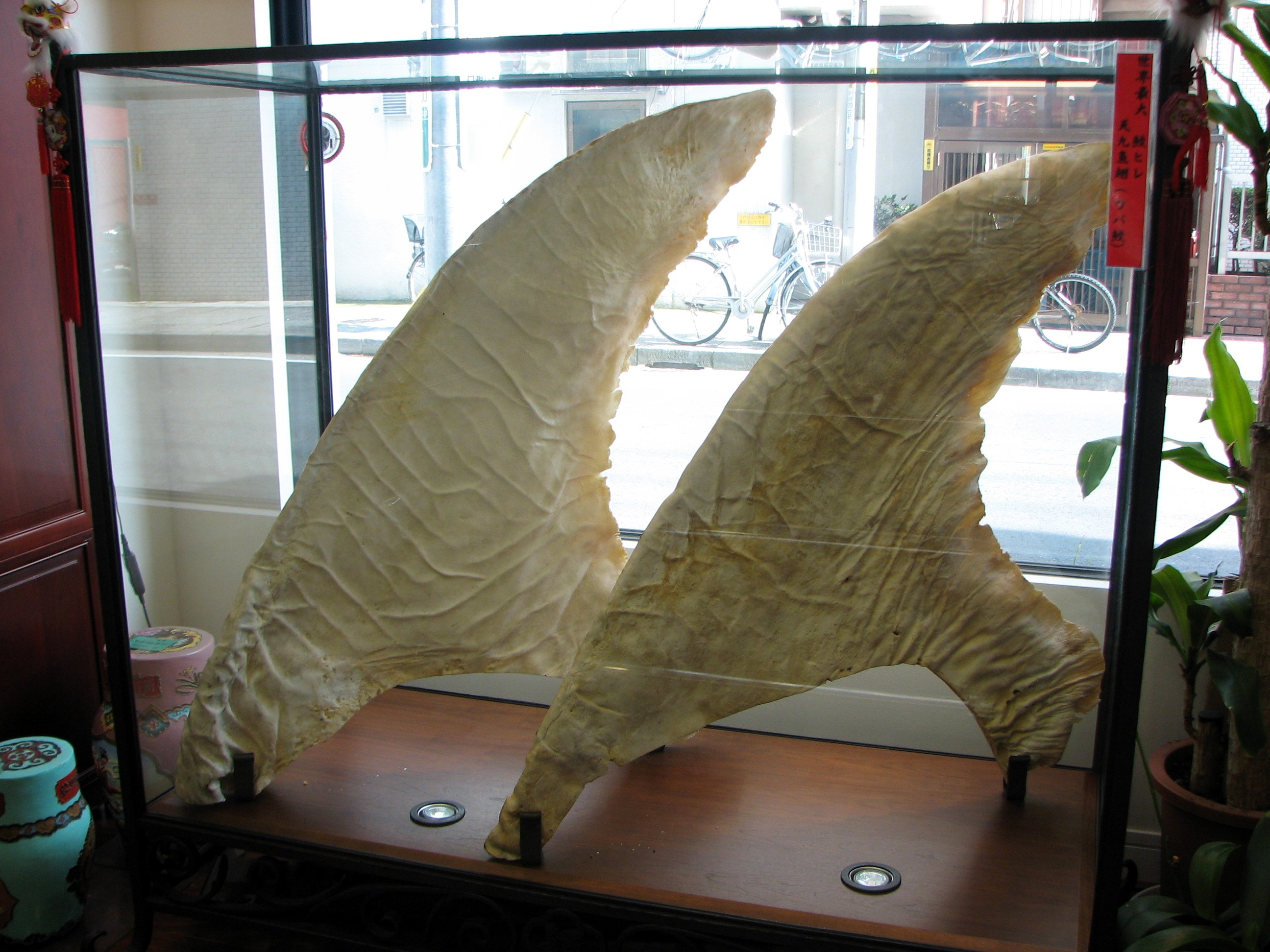
Shark fins

=== Monitoring population genetic parameters – Category II ===
Monitoring of population changes through genetic means can be done retrospectively, through analysis of 'historical' DNA recovered from museum-archived species and comparison with contemporary DNA of that species. It can also be used as a tool for evaluating ongoing changes in the status and persistence of current populations. Genetic measures of relative population change include changes in diversity (e.g. heterozygosity and allelic richness). Monitoring of relative population changes through these metrics has been performed retrospectively for Beringian bison, Galapagos tortoise, houting, Atlantic salmon, northern pike, New Zealand snapper, steelhead trout, greater prairie chicken, Mauritius kestrel and Hector's dolphin and is the subject of many ongoing studies, including Danish and Swedish brown trout populations. Measuring absolute population changes (e.g. effective population size (Ne)) can be carried out by measuring changes in population allele frequencies (‘Ftemporal’) or levels of linkage disequilibrium over time (‘LDNe’), while changing patterns of gene flow between populations can also be monitored by estimating differences in allele frequencies between populations over time. Subjects of such studies include grizzly bears, cod, red deer, Leopard frogs and Barrel Medic.

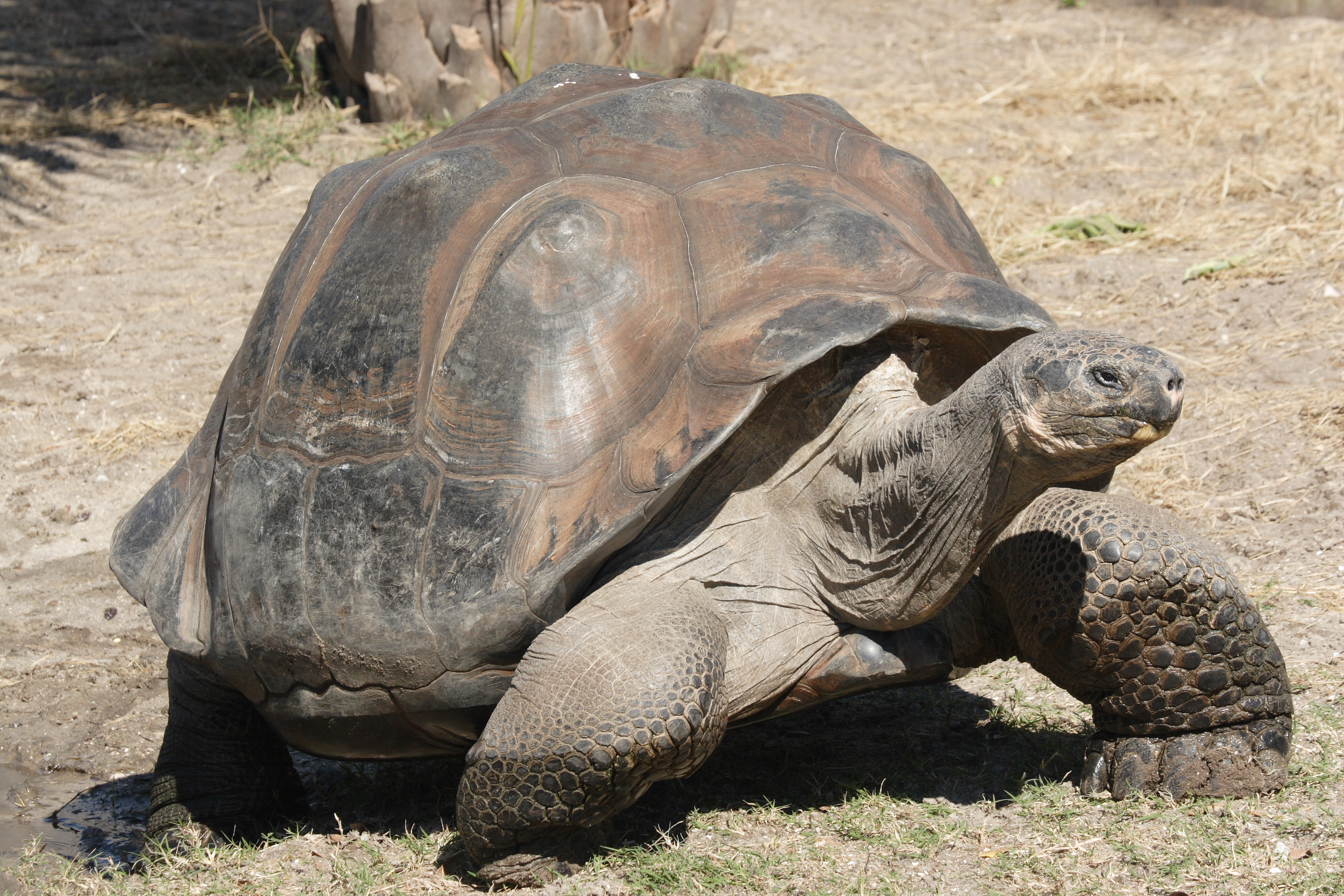
Galapagos giant tortoise

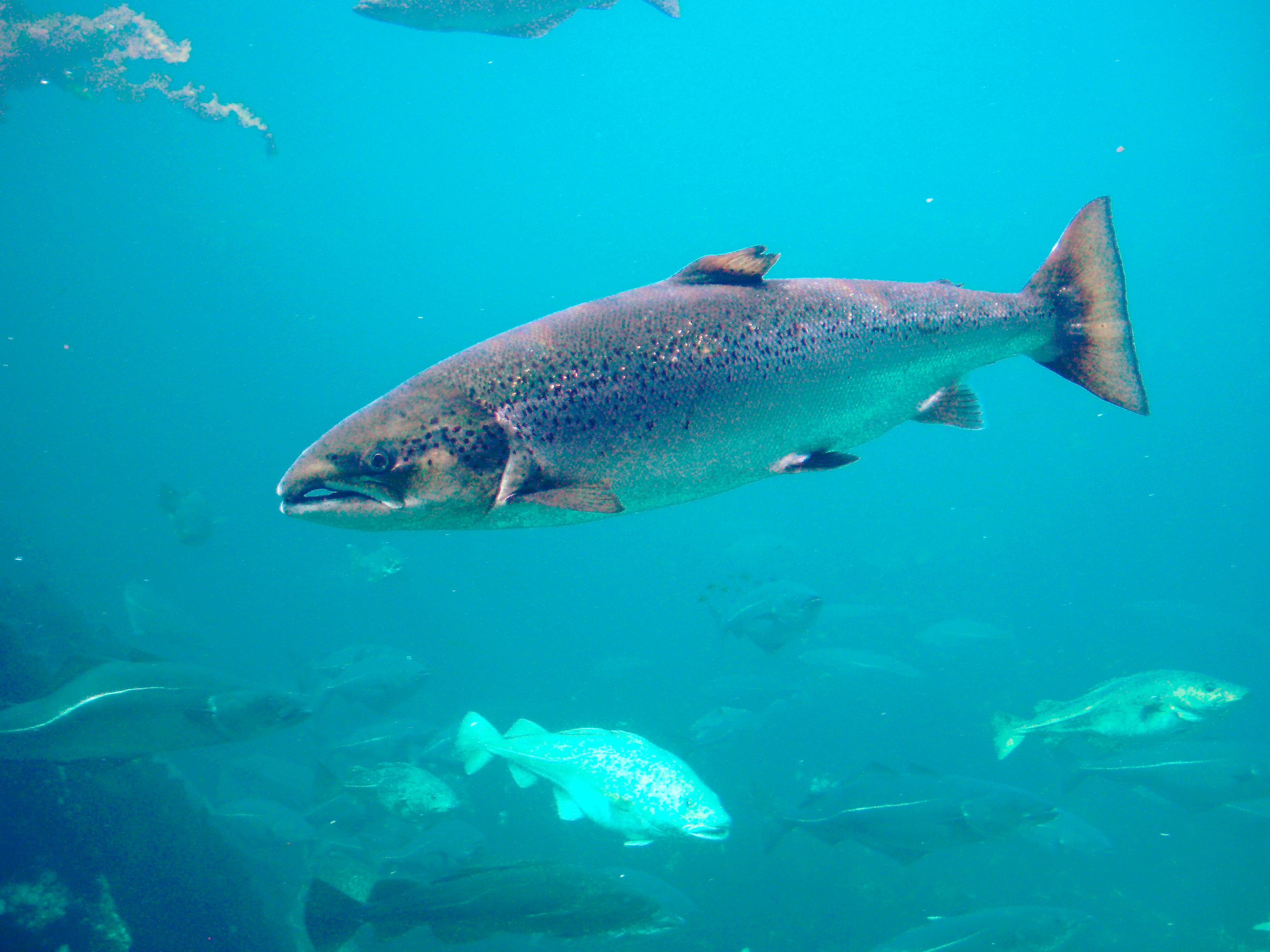
Atlantic salmon

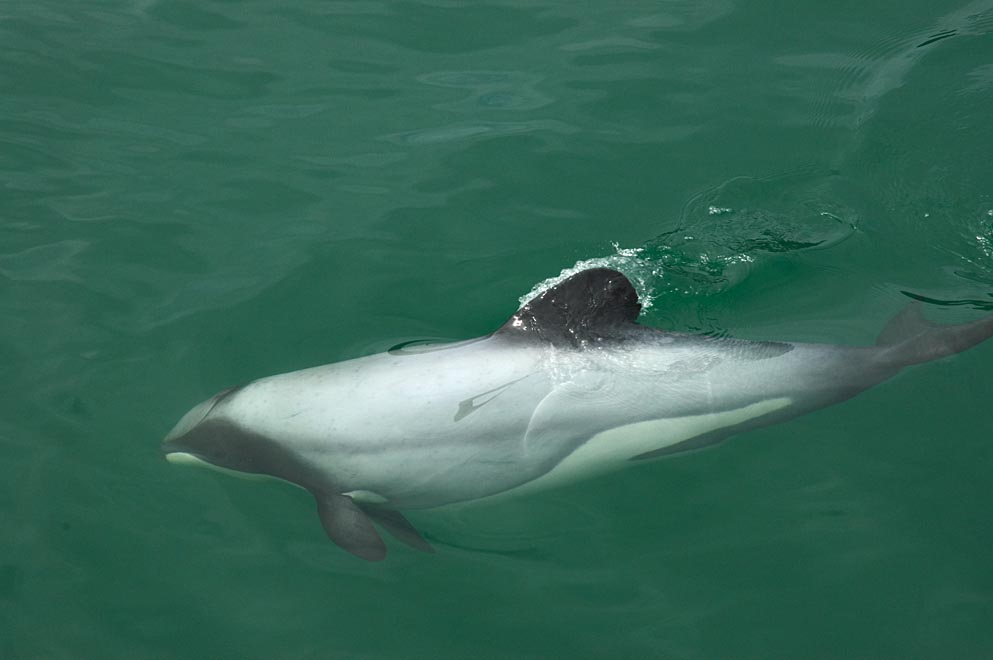
Hector's dolphin

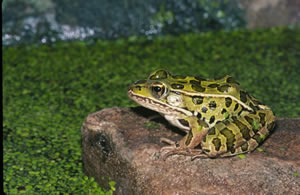
Northern leopard frog

Genetic monitoring has also been increasingly used in studies that monitor environmental changes through changes in the frequency of adaptively selected markers. For example, the genetically controlled photo-periodic response (hibernating time) of pitcher-plant mosquitos (Wyeomyia smithii) has shifted in response to longer growing seasons for pitcher plants brought on by warmer weather. Experimental wheat populations grown in contrasting environments over a period of 12 generations found that changes in flowering time were closely correlated with regulatory changes in one gene, suggesting a pathway for genetic adaptation to changing climate in plants.

Genetic monitoring is also useful in monitoring the ongoing health of small, relocated populations. Good examples of this are found for New Zealand birds, many species of which were greatly impacted by habitat destruction and the appearance of numerous mammalian predators in the last century and have recently become part of relocation programs that transfer a few ‘founder’ individuals to predator-free offshore “ecological” islands. E.g. black robin, and kākāpō.

Category II genetic monitoring of population genetic diversity (PGD) of wild species, for purposes of biodiversity conservation and sustainable management, is unevenly distributed among countries in Europe. Country size and per capita Gross Domestic Product (GDP) are statistically associated in different ways with the number of documented monitoring projects, suggesting that available habitat for species and country financial resources influence monitoring effort. There is relatively little genetic monitoring for PGD conducted in southeastern Europe. Much attention has been directed towards monitoring of large carnivores, and relatively little effort towards monitoring species in other groups, such as amphibians.

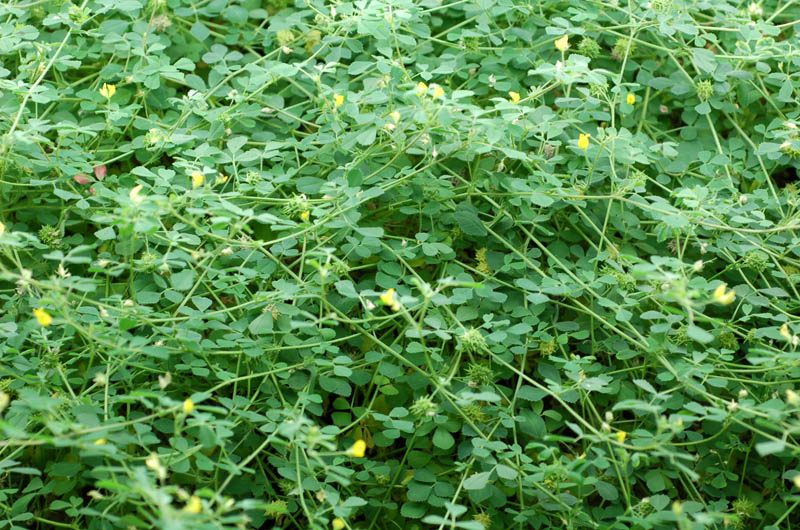
Barrel medic

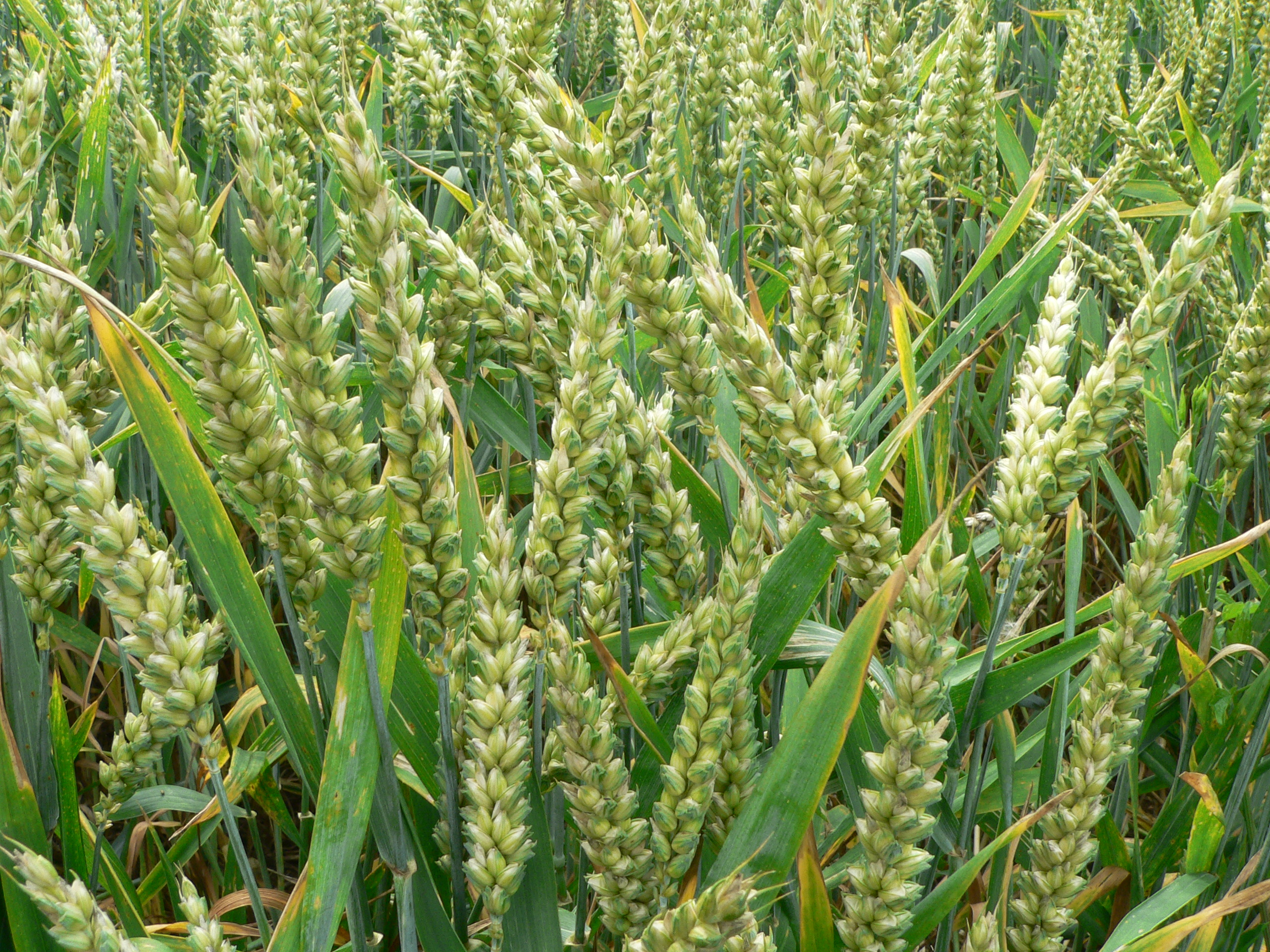
Common wheat

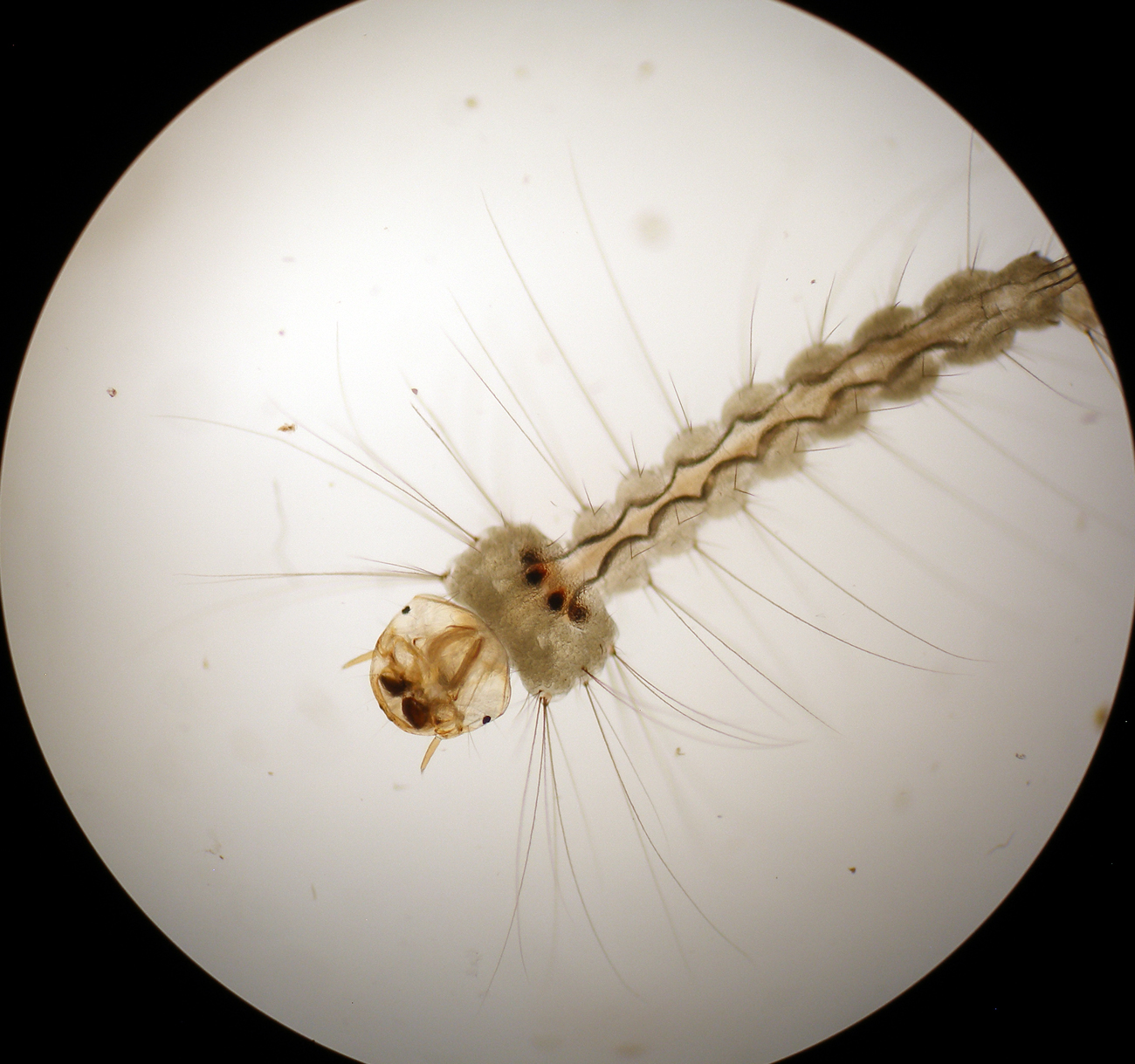
Pitcher plant mosquito

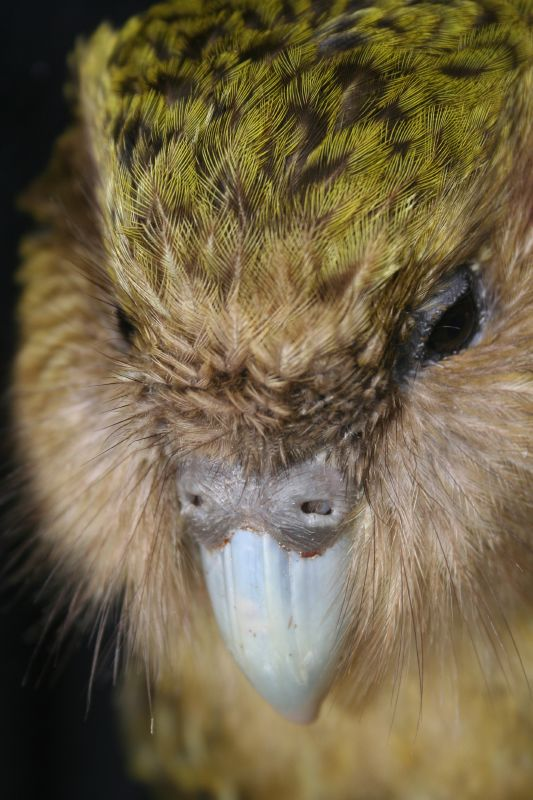
Kākāpō – New Zealand night parrot

== Status of genetic monitoring in science ==
In February 2007 an international summit was held at the Institute of the Environment at UCLA, concerning ‘Evolutionary Change in Human Altered Environments: An International Summit to translate Science into Policy’. This led to a special issue of the journal of Molecular Ecology organized around our understanding of genetic effects in three main categories: (i) habitat disturbance and climate change (ii) exploitation and captive breeding (iii) invasive species and pathogens.

In 2007 a Working Group on Genetic Monitoring was launched with joint support from NCEAS and NESCent to further develop the techniques involved and provide general monitoring guidance for policy makers and managers.

Currently the topic is covered in several well known text books, including McComb et al. (2010) and Allendorf et al. (2013).

== Genetic monitoring in natural resource agencies ==
Many natural resource agencies see genetic monitoring as a cost-effective and defensible way to monitor fish and wildlife populations. As such scientists in the U.S. Geological Survey, U.S. Forest Service, National Park Service, and National Marine Fisheries Service have been developing new methods and tools to use genetic monitoring, and applying such tools across broad geographic scales. Currently the USFWS hosts a website that informs managers as to the best way to use genetic tools for monitoring (see below).

== See also ==
- Ecological genetics
- Molecular genetics
- Conservation genetics
- Landscape genetics
