= Ecological Genetics (book) =

1964 book by the British biologist E. B. Ford

- Author: E. B. Ford
- Subject: Ecological genetics
- Genre: Non-fiction
- Publisher: Chapman & Hall
- Publication date: 1964
- ISBN: 0412103206 (3rd edition)

Ecological Genetics is a 1964 book by the British biologist E. B. Ford on ecological genetics. Ford founded the field and it is considered his magnum opus. The fourth and final edition was published in 1975.

Ford's work was celebrated in 1971 by Ecological Genetics and Evolution, a series of essays edited by Robert Creed, publ. Blackwell, Oxford. This included contributions from Cyril Darlington, Miriam Rothschild, Theodosius Dobzhansky, Bryan Clarke, A.J. Cain, Sir Cyril Clarke and others.

Ford and Ronald Fisher represented one side of a dispute with the American Sewall Wright over the relative roles of selection and drift in evolution.

Ecological Genetics had also Polish and French editions.

== See also ==
- Papilio dardanus (the swallowtail butterfly that is the subject of chapter thirteen)
