= Genetic ecology =

Study of genetic material in the environment

Genetic ecology is the study of the stability and expression of varying genetic material within abiotic mediums. Typically, genetic data is not thought of outside of any organism save for criminal forensics. However, genetic material has the ability to be taken up by various organisms that exist within an abiotic medium through natural transformations that may occur. Thus, this field of study focuses on interaction, exchange, and expression of genetic material that may not be shared by species had they not been in the same environment.

== History ==
E.B. Ford was the first geneticist to begin work in this field of study. E.B. Ford worked mostly during the 1950s and is most noted for his work with Maniola jurtina and published a book entitled Ecological Genetics in 1975. This type of evolutionary biological study was only possible after gel electrophoresis had been designed in 1937. Prior to this, a high throughput method for DNA analysis did not exist. This field of study began to become more popular following the 1980s with the development of polymerase chain reaction (PCR 1985) and poly-acrylamide gel electrophoresis (p. 1967). With this technology, segments of DNA could be sequenced, amplified, and proteins produced using bacterial transformations. The genetic material along with the proteins could be analyzed and more correct phylogenetic trees could be created.

Since E.B. Ford's research, multiple other genetic ecologists have continued study within the field of genetic ecology such as PT Hanford Alina von Thaden, and many others.

== Gene transfer ==
Genetic information may transfer throughout an ecosystem in multiple ways. The first of which, on the smallest scale, being bacterial gene transfer (see bacterial transformation). Bacteria have the ability to exchange DNA. This DNA exchange, or horizontal gene transfer, may provide various species of bacteria with the genetic information they need to survive in an environment. This can help many bacterial species survive within an environment.

A similar event has the ability to happen between plants and bacteria. For example, Agrobacterium tumefaciens has the ability to introduce genes into plants to cause the development of Gall disease. This occurs through genetic transfer between the A. tumefaciens and between the plant in question.

In fact, a similar event occurs each time viral infections occur within living organisms. The viruses, whether positive or negative sense viruses, require a living organism to replicate their genes and produce more viruses. Once a virus is inside a living organism, it utilizes polymerases, ribosomes, and other biomolecules to replicate its own genetic material and to produce more virus genetic material similar to the original virus. Thus, gene transfer may occur through many varying means. Thus, the study of this gene transfer throughout each ecosystem, whether it be through a bacterial ecosystem or through the ecosystem of an organism, genetic ecology is the study of this gene transfer and its causes.

== See also ==
- Ecological genetics
