= Evolutionarily significant unit =

Organism populations in conservation

An evolutionarily significant unit (ESU) is a population of organisms that is considered distinct for purposes of conservation. Delineating ESUs is important when considering conservation action. An ESU is not always equivalent to a biological species but can be also a subspecies, variety, geographic race, or population. In marine animals the term "stock" is often used as well.

== Definition ==
Definitions of an ESU generally include at least one of the following criteria:

1. Current geographic separation,
2. Genetic differentiation at neutral markers among related ESUs caused by past restriction of gene flow, or
3. Locally adapted phenotypic traits caused by differences in selection.

Criterion 2 considers the gene flow between populations, measured by F_{ST}. A high degree of differentiation between two populations among genes that provide no adaptive advantage to either population (known as neutral markers) implies a lack of gene flow, showing that random drift has occurred in isolation from other populations. Very few migrants per generation are needed to prevent strong differentiation of neutral markers. Even a single migrant per generation may be enough for neutral markers to show gene flow between populations, making it difficult to differentiate the populations through neutral markers.

Criterion 3 does not consider neutral genetic markers, instead looking at locally adapted traits of the population. Local adaptations may be present even with some gene flow from other populations, and even when there is little differentiation at neutral markers among ESUs. Reciprocal transplantation experiments are necessary to test for genetic differentiation for phenotypic traits, and differences in selection gradients across habitats. Such experiments are generally more difficult than the fixation index tests of criterion 2, and may be impossible for very rare or endangered species.

For example, Cryan's buckmoth (Hemileuca maia) feeds only on the herb Menyanthes trifoliata, commonly known as buckbean, and while indistinguishable morphologically from related buckmoths, and not differentiated at the genetic markers tested, the moth is highly adapted to its host plant, having 100% survivorship on Menyanthes, while close genetic relatives all died when reared on the plant. In this case gene flow was sufficient to reduce differentiation at neutral markers, but did not prevent local host adaptation.

Both criteria 2 and 3 have the problem that there is no clear dichotomy between ESU and not-ESU, as genetic differentiation between populations forms a continuum, prompting a contention for consideration of both genetic and ecological processes in identifying ESUs. Because the different approaches to designating ESUs each have their benefits, and the need and form of management prescriptions may vary across contexts, some support an "adaptive" approach to identification of ESUs, for instance suggesting consideration of facets from numerous designation methods.

== United States Endangered Species Act ==
For the purposes of the Endangered Species Act a "species" is defined to include "any distinct population segment of any species of vertebrate fish or wildlife which interbreeds when mature." However, the act does not define what constitutes a "distinct population segment", but this is generally considered to be synonymous with an evolutionarily significant unit, so that it must:

1. be substantially reproductively isolated from other conspecific populations, and
2. represent an important component in the evolutionary legacy of the biological species

== Other equivalent terms ==
The equivalent term used by COSEWIC is "Wildlife Species", which is used to refer to biological species, subspecies, varieties, or geographically or genetically distinct populations of organisms.

== See also ==
- The species problem
- FSTAT (software)
