= Ecological genetics =

Study of genetics in natural populations

Ecological genetics is the study of genetics in natural populations. It combines ecology, evolution, and genetics to understand the processes behind adaptation. It is virtually synonymous with the field of molecular ecology.

This contrasts with classical genetics, which works mostly on crosses between laboratory strains, and DNA sequence analysis, which studies genes at the molecular level.

Research in this field is on traits of ecological significance—traits that affect an organism's fitness, or its ability to survive and reproduce. Examples of such traits include flowering time, drought tolerance, polymorphism, mimicry, and avoidance of attacks by predators.

Research usually involves a mixture of field and laboratory studies. Samples of natural populations may be taken back to the laboratory for their genetic variation to be analyzed. Changes in the populations at different times and places will be noted, and the pattern of mortality in these populations will be studied. Research is often done on organisms that have short generation times, such as insects and microbial communities.

== History ==
Although work on natural populations had been done previously, it is acknowledged that the field was founded by the English biologist E.B. Ford (1901–1988) in the early 20th century. Ford started research on the genetics of natural populations in 1924 and worked extensively to develop his formal definition of genetic polymorphism. Ford's magnum opus was Ecological Genetics, which ran to four editions and was widely influential.

Other notable ecological geneticists include R. A. Fisher and Theodosius Dobzhansky. Fisher helped form what is known as the modern synthesis of ecology, by mathematically merging the ideas of Darwin and Mendel. Dobzhansky worked on chromosome polymorphism in fruit flies. He and his colleagues carried out studies on natural populations of Drosophila species in western USA and Mexico over many years.

Philip Sheppard, Cyril Clarke, Bernard Kettlewell and A.J. Cain were all strongly influenced by Ford; their careers date from the post World War II era. Collectively, their work on lepidoptera and on human blood groups established the field and threw light on selection in natural populations, where its role had been once doubted.

== Research ==
=== Inheritance and Natural Selection ===
Ecological genetics is closely tied to the concept of natural selection. Many classical ecology works have employed aspects of ecological genetics, investigating how inheritance and the environment affect individuals.

Ecological genetics further explores how inherited genetic variation influences an organism's ability to survive and reproduce in specific environments. Natural selection favours traits that enhance fitness, while other evolutionary forces, including mutations, gene flow, and genetic drift can play crucial roles in shaping the genetic makeup of populations. These interactions can drive local adaptation and evolutionary change. Earlier discussions questioned whether random mutation alone could account for the complexity observed in genetic sequences. While this remains a point of theoretical interest, molecular tools in modern ecological genetics have enabled researchers to identify genetic variants under selection in natural populations.

==== Industrial Melanism in Peppered Moths ====
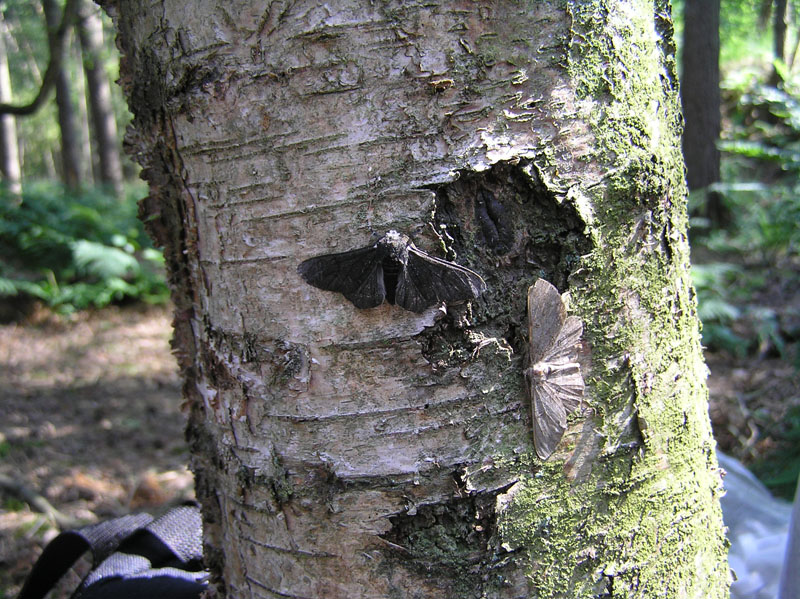
Light and dark (melanic) peppered moths on an unpolluted tree. The light "typica" morph (at right, below the scar) is camouflaged against the bark, while the dark "carbonaria" morph (left) is conspicuous. In polluted forests with soot-darkened bark, the situation is reversed, giving dark moths a survival advantage.

Industrial melanism in the peppered moth Biston betularia is a well-known example of the process of natural selection. The typical wing colour phenotype of B. betularia is black and white flecks, but variant 'melanic' phenotypes with increased amounts of black also occur. In the nineteenth century, the frequency of these melanic variants increased rapidly. Many biologists proposed explanations for this phenomenon. It was demonstrated in the early 1910s, and again in many later studies, that the melanic variants were a result of dominant alleles at a single locus in the B. betularia genome. The proposed explanations, then, centered around various environmental factors that could contribute to natural selection. In particular, it was proposed that bird predation was selecting for the melanic moth forms, which were more cryptic in industrialized areas. H. B. D. Kettlewell investigated this hypothesis extensively in the early 1950s.

Uncertainty surrounding whether birds preyed on moths at all posed an initial challenge, leading Kettlewell to perform a series of experiments with captive birds. These experiments, while initially unsuccessful, found that when a variety of insects are provided, the birds did preferentially prey on the most conspicuous moths: those with coloration unmatched to their surroundings. Kettlewell then performed field experiments using mark-recapture techniques to investigate the selective predation of moths in their natural habitat. These experiments found that in woods near industrialized areas, melanic moth forms were recaptured at much higher rates than the traditional lighter-coloured forms, while in non-industrialized woods, the reverse held true.

More recent research has further emphasized the role of genetics in the case of industrialized melanism in B. betularia. While research had already emphasized the role of alleles in determining wing-color phenotype, it was still unknown whether the melanic alleles had a single origin or had arisen multiple times independently. The use of molecular marking and chromosomal mapping in conjunction with population surveys demonstrated in the early 2010s that the melanic B. betularia variants have one single ancestral origin. Additionally, the melanic variants appear to have arisen by mutation from a typical wing-colour phenotype.

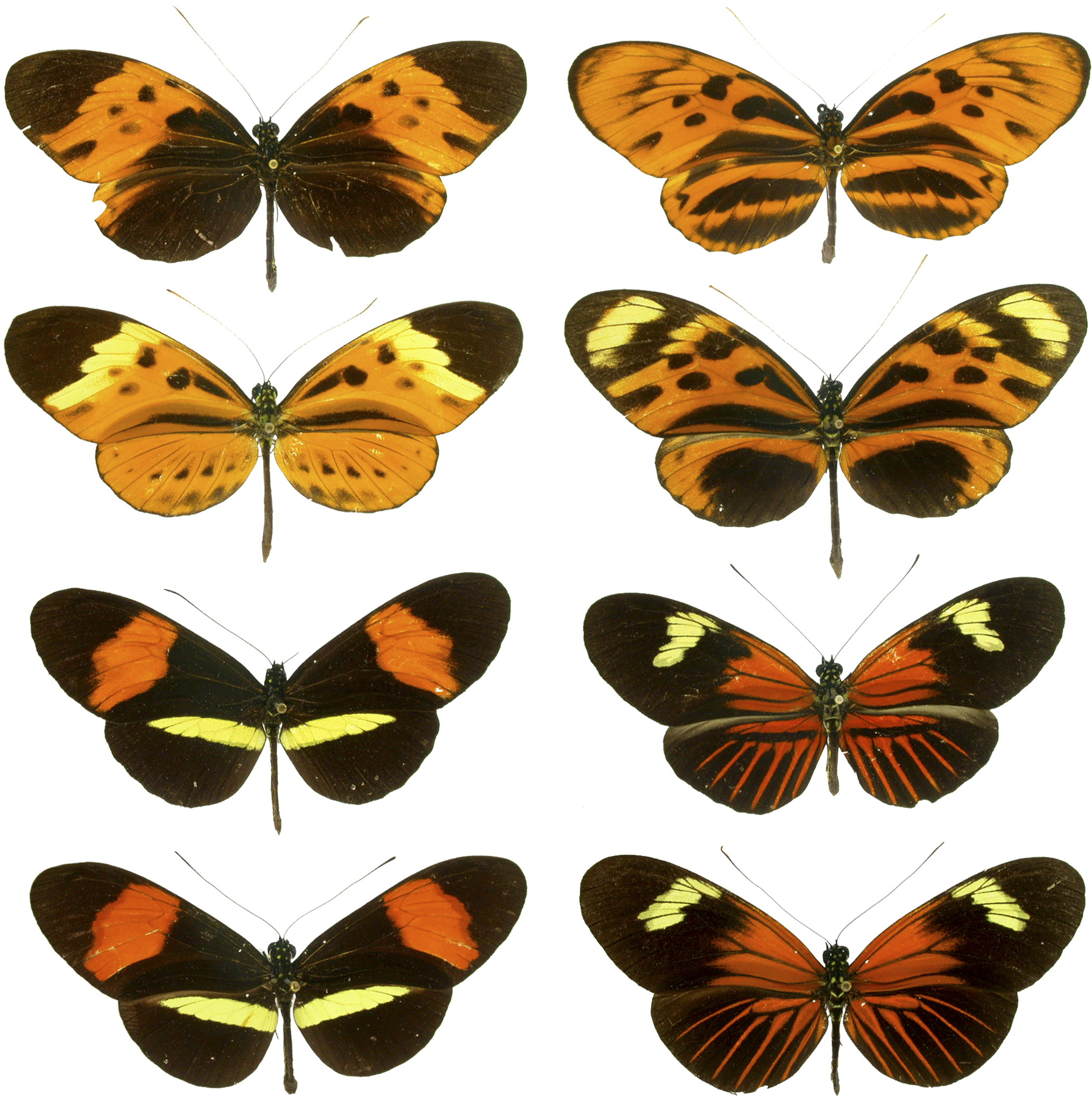
Mimicry polymorphism in ''Heliconius'' butterflies. Top two rows: four forms of ''H. numata'' (orange/yellow patterns). Bottom two rows: two forms of ''H. melpomene'' (left of each pair) alongside the corresponding local forms of ''H. erato'' (right). Each ''H. melpomene'' mimics the ''H. erato'' in the same locale. Such wing pattern diversity is maintained by local selection, and different genetic loci control the color pattern switches. (Image from Meyer 2006, PLOS Biology, CC-BY license.)

Another classic example is warning coloration and mimicry in butterflies, which Ford and colleagues studied to understand polymorphism maintained by predation. In tropical American butterflies of the genus ''Heliconius'', multiple species share bright wing color patterns as part of Müllerian mimicry rings (where toxic species mimic each other for mutual benefit). Within a single ''Heliconius'' species, populations can display strikingly different color forms, each form matching the local co-mimic community. For instance, ''Heliconius erato'' and ''Heliconius melpomene'' co-occur across many locales, and in each locale they have evolved nearly identical wing patterns – red band and yellow spots in one region, orange and black in another, and so on – despite being distinct species. The maintenance of multiple color morphs within species, each favored in its specific geographic region, is an ecological genetics phenomenon: the different morphs are tied to survival, because local predators learn the warning pattern. A butterfly with a non-matching pattern is more likely to be mistaken for an edible insect and attacked. Research by ecological geneticists showed that these color pattern differences are under simple genetic control (often a few major loci, sometimes characterized as a "supergene"), and that gene flow between populations is counteracted by strong local selection favoring the regional pattern. In the case of ''Heliconius'', modern genomic studies have identified specific genes (such as variants of the gene ''optix'') that create the red wing band in multiple species – an example of convergent evolution at the genetic level. Ford's protégé Philip Sheppard and geneticist Sir Cyril Clarke also famously studied Batesian mimicry in African swallowtail butterflies (''Papilio'') during the 1950s–60s, uncovering polymorphic female forms: some females mimic toxic butterflies (to avoid predation), while others do not. They found that a single genetic locus with multiple alleles produces the different female morphs in ''Papilio polytes'', and frequency-dependent selection (predators being more likely to attack the rarer-looking forms) helped maintain the polymorphism. These butterfly studies demonstrated how complex interactions between predators, prey, and the environment can maintain balanced polymorphisms in nature. The work on mimicry, spanning over a century and continuing today, underscores a key theme of ecological genetics: natural selection can preserve genetic diversity when different environments or ecological interactions favor different genotypes, leading to a patchwork of adaptations across the landscape.

=== Polygenic Selection ===
Research on ecologically important traits has traditionally focused on single alleles. However, in many cases, phenotypes are controlled by multiple alleles. Complex traits, such as traits involved in morphology, behaviour, life history or disease are often controlled by multiple alleles and are therefore polygenic traits. Through the use of genome-wide association studies (GWAS), researchers are able to scan genomes and identify loci associated with complex traits. Observing changes in allele frequency across a population can provide insight into polygenic adaptation.

A major line of evidence for polygenic traits can be drawn from artificial selection. Many experiments involving artificial selection have shown that traits often respond rapidly and steadily, suggesting they are influenced by many genes with small effects. For example, between 1957 and 2001, the weight of eight-week-old chickens increased by 4 times. This sustained improvement over time wouldn't make sense if only a few alleles of large effect were responsible for this phenotype, as the alleles would rapidly reach fixation, causing phenotypic change to plateau.

The prevalence of traits with a polygenic basis poses some issues when researching traits and adaptation in natural populations. With complex traits, it may be hard to separate the effects of genes, environmental factors, and random genetic drift.

== Technology ==
Ecological genetics combines various technologies to study the genetics underlying adaptive behaviours in populations.

=== Animal Tracking Technologies ===
Animal instrumentation provides different types of biological information, involving migration patterns, habitat selection, energy spent and temporal patterns, which are used to study population dynamics. These tools include:

- Heart-rate monitors: Assesses stress levels.
- Accelerometers: Measures acceleration of an object for activities such as diving or foraging.
- Acoustic recorders: Captures communication between organisms.
- Video recorders: Observes foraging behaviour, habitat interface and social interaction.
- Temperature loggers: Devices that measure body temperature patterns.
- Automated image-based tracking: Tracks behavioural patterns, social interactions and predator-prey interactions.

=== DNA Sequencing ===
Once data is collected using the animal tracking technologies, DNA sequencing technologies are used to analyze the genetic composition of the studied populations. DNA sequencing provides insight into the relationship between behaviour, migration patterns, and gene flow. Gene flow plays a role in evolutionary processes. In order for DNA sequencing to occur, DNA samples, including blood, tissue or saliva, are collected from animals. This DNA is then sequenced using next-generation sequencing (NGS) techniques, which allows for simultaneous sequencing of high quantities of DNA fragments in parallel.

- RNA sequencing: This is a NGS technique commonly used in ecological genetics. It's used to identify all of the expressed genes in a given cell or tissue. The RNA is first reverse transcribed into cDNA and adaptors are added. These fragments are then run through next-generation sequencing technology. During next-generation sequencing, thousands of DNA fragments are sequenced simultaneously, generating thousands of reads in a single run. The reads are either aligned with a reference genome or assembled de novo. This information is used to identify differences in gene expression between tissues, species and populations.
- Chromatin-immuno-precipitation sequencing (ChIP-seq): Another NGS technology used in ecological genetics. ChIP-seq identifies differences in transcription factor binding. This is used to examine how transcription factors influence gene expression in different environments and across populations. The process of ChIP-seq involves crosslinking DNA to transcription factor proteins, then fragmenting the DNA to produce small pieces of DNA. The DNA-transcription factor complex is then isolated through immunoprecipitation, which involves the binding of an antibody to the protein. The isolated DNA can then be sequenced.

=== SNP Genotyping ===
Single nucleotide polymorphism (SNP) genotyping is a technique used to look at the nucleotides at specific loci, used as a marker for genetic variation in a population. SNP genotyping allows researchers to observe changes in genotype frequencies throughout different habitats.

One example of the application of SNP genotyping is the ecological genetic study by Park et al. on the Rocky Mountain Apollo butterfly (Parnassius smintheus). The researchers performed a removal experiment on certain patches to see the effect of population reduction on the neighbouring patches. 4,830 butterflies were removed from two specific patches, P and Q over the course of eight years. They genotyped a sample of the population from patch P and Q over the years, as well as samples from neighbouring patches to assess the impact of the population reduction on genetic composition. They used 152 SNP loci to study the genetic variation in the populations. When analyzing the SNPs, the researchers noticed there was no significant change in mean allelic richness or expected heterozygosity between populations despite constant removal. The percentage of loci out of Hardy-Weinberg equilibrium and percentage of SNP pairs in linkage disequilibrium increased with each year, suggesting demographic changes may have influenced the population.

Other ecological genetics studies have used SNP genotyping to understand the relationship between genetic diversity in a population and environmental pressures.

=== Environmental DNA ===
Environmental DNA (eDNA) is genetic material that is collected from the environment, rather than directly from an organism.

In ecological genetics, eDNA provides a non-invasive way to assess variation in population structures, detect species presence, and monitor gene flow or diversity in natural habitats. This makes eDNA a valuable tool in modern ecological genetics, becoming especially useful when direct sampling is impractical or invasive.

Tissue based analysis and eDNA methods both consistently produce similar allele frequencies and genetic variation patterns within and between populations. This reinforces the reliability of eDNA as an alternative to the traditional way of sampling techniques.

The ability to assess ecological and evolutionary processes across multiple levels of biological organization, where individuals to entire ecosystems can be studied, offers a powerful approach to understanding biodiversity and genetic dynamics. As a result, eDNA is useful in detection of species but can further be utilized in exploring how evolutionary processes enable genetic patterns in shaping natural systems.

=== Generative AI and Ecological Genetics ===
Generative artificial intelligence (AI) refers to models that are capable of generating new content, such as text, images, data, based on patterns learned from existing information. These models are being investigated as potential complementary tools in ecological genetics, where they may support research related to evolutionary processes and environmental interactions. By learning from large data sets, generative AI can be applied to predict or classify outcomes, which may include modeling scenarios such as genetic divergence, speciation, or genetic flow under various ecological condition. In some contexts, agent-based and generative models have been used to simulate patterns such as adaptive radiation, contributing to hypothetical ecological populations. Generative models also have been used to explore relationships between complex traits and environmental factors, potentially linking phenotypic traits to ecological function and evolutionary patterns. In addition, they may assist in addressing missing data issues resulting from limited sampling, species, rarity, or constraints in data collection methods.

== Applications and Related Fields ==
Ecological genetics has important applications in several fields and helps address practical problems. One major applied area is conservation biology, where principles of ecological genetics inform the management of endangered species and biodiversity. Conservation genetics – a subfield that emerged in the 1980s – draws on ecological genetic studies to maintain or increase the genetic diversity of small populations, thereby enhancing their ability to adapt to changing environments. For example, knowing the extent of local adaptation in different populations of a species can guide translocations or captive breeding, ensuring that released individuals have genetic makeup suited to their habitat. Conservation biologists also use molecular markers (like those used in ecological genetics research) to monitor inbreeding levels, gene flow between habitat fragments, and adaptive variation (such as disease resistance genes) in vulnerable wildlife populations. By integrating genetic data into species vulnerability assessments under climate change, researchers can better predict which populations have the evolutionary potential (adaptive genetic variants) to cope with new conditions. For instance, Razgour et al. (2019) showed that accounting for adaptive genetic variation in climate models altered projections of range loss for bat species, emphasizing the need to preserve locally adapted gene complexes to facilitate "evolutionary rescue" under climate change.

Another application is in agriculture and medicine, specifically in understanding and slowing the evolution of pesticide and antibiotic resistance. Pests and pathogens are essentially natural populations undergoing strong selection from human-used chemicals, making this a direct case of ecological genetics at work. Studies of insect pest populations have documented how genetic variants conferring pesticide resistance can increase in frequency within just a few generations of pesticide application. Similarly, bacteria exposed to antibiotics evolve resistance through selection of resistant mutants or gene transfer of resistance elements. By applying ecological genetic principles, scientists and policymakers devise strategies to manage resistance evolution – for example, using refuges of non-treated crops to maintain susceptible alleles in pest populations (diluting resistance genes), or cycling drugs to prevent any one resistance genotype from becoming fixed. These strategies stem from models of gene frequency dynamics in populations, a core subject of ecological genetics. The emergence of resistance is also a vivid reminder that evolutionary change can be very rapid when selection pressures are intense, underscoring the practical importance of understanding genetics in the wild.

Ecological genetics has significant overlap with and has given rise to several related disciplines. Molecular ecology is one such field – it uses molecular genetic tools (DNA sequences, molecular markers) to address ecological questions, often in natural populations. In many respects, molecular ecology can be seen as the modern extension of ecological genetics, adding the ability to directly analyze DNA to the existing toolkit of the field. The boundaries between the two are fuzzy; for instance, a study on the population structure and local adaptation of a fish species using genome sequencing could be called molecular ecology, ecological genetics, or both. Another related area is evolutionary ecology, which generally focuses on how evolutionary processes (like adaptation, competition, coevolution) shape ecological patterns. Ecological genetics can be considered a subset of evolutionary ecology that zeroes in on genetic mechanisms. Indeed, some authors treat the terms as nearly synonymous.

In recent years, the term ecological genomics or environmental genomics has gained usage for studies that employ whole-genome approaches to multiple individuals from natural populations, linking gene function to ecological context. For example, researchers might sequence the genomes of many individuals of a plant species across an environmental gradient to find gene variants associated with climate adaptation (a genomic scan for selection). This approach builds on ecological genetic principles and takes advantage of high-throughput sequencing technology. Fields like landscape genetics (which studies how geographical features affect gene flow and genetic structure) and genetic monitoring (tracking genetic metrics of populations over time) also owe much to the integration of ecology and genetics pioneered by ecological genetics.

Through these related fields, ecological genetics contributes to our understanding of broad issues such as how species will adapt (or fail to adapt) to global change, how new species arise (speciation can involve divergent adaptation in different environments), and how humans can better conserve and manage the Earth's biota. It remains a critical link between the laboratory and the field, bringing genetic analysis to the study of natural populations and thereby enriching both evolutionary theory and ecological management.

== Challenges and Limitations ==
Ecological genetic research faces several challenges and limitations, many of which stem from the complexity of studying evolution in nature. One practical challenge is that such work often requires long-term studies and extensive data collection. Detecting evolutionary changes or genetic shifts in wild populations may demand monitoring across multiple generations – sometimes decades – which can exceed the typical duration of research funding or careers. Some famous study systems (for example, butterfly mimicry) have been observed for over a century, yet still yield new insights. Sustained support (financial and logistical) is needed to maintain experiments like field enclosures, pedigree tracking, or multi-year genome sequencing efforts in the wild. Historically, Ford and colleagues noted that obtaining continuous funding for such "outdoor genetics" was difficult, though today the value of long-term ecological research is more widely recognized.

Another challenge is the requirement for expertise across disciplines. Ecological geneticists must be well-versed in ecology (to understand the organism's environment and natural history) and genetics (to design crosses or molecular assays), as well as statistics and bioinformatics (to analyze complex data). This interdisciplinary nature can be demanding – experiments must be carefully designed to isolate genetic effects amid environmental variation, and analyses must distinguish genetic changes from random demographic fluctuations. For instance, separating the signal of natural selection from genetic drift or gene flow in a wild population's data can be statistically tricky, especially for polygenic traits where changes are subtle. The rise of genomic data has, in some ways, amplified this issue: huge numbers of genetic markers provide power to detect selection, but also increase the risk of false signals if not properly controlled. Ecological context is crucial; failing to account for factors like population structure or seasonal environmental changes can lead to misattributing causes to observed genetic patterns.

A limitation that became apparent in the mid-20th century was the difficulty of detecting balanced polymorphisms and their maintaining forces. By definition, if multiple alleles are maintained by selection (e.g. heterozygote advantage or frequency-dependent selection), their frequency might remain stable over time, making selection hard to detect without perturbation experiments. Ecological genetics often relies on observing changes (e.g. allele frequency shifts after an environmental change) or differences between populations. When selection maintains a status quo, it can be invisible to a short-term observer. Experimental manipulations – such as altering predation pressure or transplanting individuals to new environments – are sometimes needed to reveal these cryptic selective forces.

Despite the challenges, modern techniques have greatly expanded the toolkit available, mitigating some limitations. High-throughput DNA sequencing and advanced statistical models allow researchers to scan entire genomes for selection signatures that would have been impossible to discern with earlier methods. Common garden and reciprocal transplant experiments can control for environmental variation to tease out genetic differences. Moreover, collaborative projects and data-sharing mean that even if individual studies are short-term, data can be combined or continued by others (for example, the LTEE – long-term evolution experiment – with ''E. coli'' bacteria has lasted over 30 years and multiple principal investigators).

Funding cycles remain a concern, but institutions and agencies have started initiatives for long-term ecological research (LTER) which often include genetic monitoring components. In addition, the increasing appreciation of evolutionary dynamics in fields like conservation and public health is creating more support for ecological genetic approaches. For instance, managing fisheries and wildlife now routinely involves genetic assessment of populations, ensuring that adaptive potential is preserved – a concept straight out of ecological genetics.

In summary, ecological genetics contend with complex systems and may slow processes, but it benefits from a wide range of methods and a strong theoretical foundation. The unpredictability of natural environments (climatic events, population fluctuations) complicates experiments; as a positive, it also allows to witness evolution under real-world conditions that no laboratory could replicate. With a growing ability to gather and analyze genetic data in the wild , the limitations (small sample sizes, few genetic markers, short observation times) are being elimintated. The field , while demanding, offers the most direct insights into "evolution in action" and the genetic basis of biodiversity. As Ford aptly noted in 1964, ecological genetics supplies "the only direct means of investigating the actual process of evolution taking place in the present time" – a statement that holds true even as new tools enhance our view of those processes.

== See also ==
- Antibiotic resistance
- Genetic ecology
- Genetic monitoring
- Peppered moth, Biston betularia
- Pesticide resistance
- Polymorphism (biology)
