= Outline of ecology =

Scientific study of the relationships between living organisms and their environment

The following outline is provided as an overview of and topical guide to ecology:

Ecology – scientific study of the distribution and abundance of living organisms and how the distribution and abundance are affected by interactions between the organisms and their environment. The environment of an organism includes both physical properties, which can be described as the sum of local abiotic factors such as solar insolation, climate and geology, as well as the other organisms that share its habitat. Also called ecological science.

== Essence of ecology ==
- Nature – Material world and its phenomena, or Natural environment – Living and non-living things on Earth
- Ecosystem – Community of living organisms together with the nonliving components of their environment, or Biome – Biogeographical unit with a particular biological community
  - Community (ecology) – Associated populations of species in a given area, or Biocoenosis – Interacting organisms living together in a habitat
    - Species – Basic unit of taxonomic classification, below genus
      - Population (biology) – Group of individuals of a species, separated from other groups by in some manner
        - Organism – Individual living life form
- Biodiversity – Variety and variability of life forms
  - Food web – Natural interconnection of food chains

== Other criteria ==
Ecology can also be classified on the basis of:

- the primary kinds of organism under study, e.g. animal ecology, plant ecology, insect ecology;
- the biomes principally studied, e.g. forest ecology, grassland ecology, desert ecology, benthic ecology, marine ecology, urban ecology;
- the geographic or climatic area, e.g. arctic ecology, tropical ecology;
- the spatial scale under consideration, e.g. macroecology, landscape ecology;
- the philosophical approach, e.g. systems ecology which adopts a holistic approach;
- the methods used, e.g. molecular ecology.

== Subdisciplines of ecology, and subdiscipline classification ==
Ecology is a broad discipline comprising many subdisciplines. The field of ecology can be subdivided according to several classification schemes:

=== By methodology used for investigation ===
- Field ecology – Collection of information outside a laboratory, library or workplace setting –
- Quantitative ecology –
- Theoretical ecology – Scientific discipline – the development of ecological theory, usually with mathematical, statistical and/or computer modeling tools.

=== By spatial scale of ecological system under study ===
- Global ecology – Global sum of all ecosystems on Earth –
- Macroecology – Study of relationships between organisms and their environment at large spatial scales –
- Microecology – Microbial ecology or ecology of a microhabitat.

=== By level of organisation or scope ===
Arranged from lowest to highest level of organisation:

- Autecology – Study of interactions of individual organisms with the environment – the study of individual organisms of a single species in relation to their environment;
- Synecology – Associated populations of species in a given area – the study of homogenous or heterogenous groups of organisms in relation to their environment;
  - Population ecology – Field of ecology – the study of homogenous groups of organisms related as a single species;
  - Community ecology – Associated populations of species in a given area – the study of heterogenous groups of organisms of multiple associated species;
  - Ecosystem ecology – Study of living and non-living components of ecosystems and their interactions.

=== By biological classification or taxon under study ===
- Human ecology – Study of humans and their environment –
- Animal ecology – Scientific study of the relationships between living animals and their environment –
- Insect ecology – Study of how insects interact with their environments –
- Microbial ecology – Study of the relationship of microorganisms with their environment –
- Plant ecology – Study of effect of the environment on the abundance and distribution of plants.

=== By biome under study ===
- Benthic ecology – Ecological region at the lowest level of a body of water –
- Desert ecology – Study of interactions between both biotic and abiotic components of desert environments –
- Forest ecology – Study of interactions between the biota and environment in forests –
- Grassland ecology – Area with vegetation dominated by grasses –
- Marine ecology – The study of the interactions between organisms and environment in the sea –
- Aquatic ecology – The study of interactions between organisms and the environment in water –
- Urban ecology – Scientific study of living organisms.

=== By biogeographic realm or climatic area under study ===
- Arctic ecology – Study of the relationships between biotic and abiotic factors in the arctic –
- Polar ecology – Relationship between plants and animals and a polar environment –
- Tropical ecology – Study of the relationships between the biotic and abiotic components of the tropics.

=== By ecological aspects or phenomena under investigation ===
- Behavioral ecology – Study of the evolutionary basis for animal behavior due to ecological pressures –
- Chemical ecology – Study of chemically-mediated interactions between living organisms – which deals with the ecological role of biological chemicals used in a wide range of areas including defense against predators and attraction of mates;
- Disease ecology – Sub-discipline of ecology – which studies host-pathogen interactions, particularly those of infectious diseases, within the context of environmental factors;
- Ecophysiology – Study of adaptation of an organism's physiology to environmental conditions – which studies the interaction of physiological traits with the abiotic environment;
- Ecotoxicology – Study of the effects of toxic chemicals on organisms – which looks at the ecological role of toxic chemicals (often pollutants, but also naturally occurring compounds);
- Evolutionary ecology – Interaction of biology and evolution – or ecoevolution which looks at evolutionary changes in the context of the populations and communities in which the organisms exist;
- Fire ecology – Study of fire in ecosystems – which looks at the role of fire in the environment of plants and animals and its effect on ecological communities;
- Functional ecology – Branch of ecology – the study of the roles, or functions, that certain species (or groups thereof) play in an ecosystem;
- Genetic ecology – Study of genetic material in the environment –
- Landscape ecology – Relationships between ecological processes in the environment and particular ecosystems –
  - Landscape limnology – Spatially explicit study of lakes, streams, and wetlands as they interact with landscapes –
- Molecular ecology – Subdiscipline of ecology –
- Paleoecology – Study of interactions between organisms and their environments across geologic timescales –
- Social ecology – Study of relationships between people and their environment –
- Soil ecology – Study of the interaction of soil and life – the ecology of the pedosphere –
- Sensory ecology –
- Spatial ecology – Study of the distribution or space occupied by species –
- Thermal ecology – the study of the relationship between temperature and organisms.

=== Ecology-involved interdisciplinary fields ===
- Agroecology – Study of ecological processes in agriculture –
- Applied ecology – the practice of employing ecological principles and understanding to solve real world problems (includes agroecology and conservation biology);
  - Conservation ecology – Study of threats to biological diversity – which studies how to reduce the risk of species extinction;
  - Restoration ecology – Scientific study of renewing and restoring ecosystems – which attempts to understand the ecological basis needed to restore impaired or damaged ecosystems;
- Biogeochemistry – Study of chemical cycles of the earth related to biological activity –
- Biogeography – Study of distribution of species –
- Ecological design – Design approach sensitive to environmental impacts –
- Ecological economics – Interdependence of human economies and natural ecosystems –
- Ecological engineering – Environmental engineering –
- Ecological anthropology – Study of cultural adaptations to environments –
  - Festive ecology – Study of ecology and cultural events –
- Ecological health –
- Ecosophy – Philosophy current –
- Environmental psychology – Academic study of the mind's relationship to one's immediate surroundings –
- Natural history – Study of organisms in their environment –
- Systems ecology – Holistic approach to the study of ecological systems –

=== Other disciplines ===
Ecology has also inspired (and lent its name to) other non-biological disciplines such as:

- Media ecology
- Industrial ecology
- Information ecology

== Biogeographic regions ==
Map of six of the world's eight terrestrial realms Nearctic Palearctic Afrotropic Indomalaya Australasia Neotropic Oceania and Antarctic realms not shown

- Biosphere – Global sum of all ecosystems on Earth

=== Terrestrial realms ===
Biogeographic realm – Broadest biogeographic division of Earth. The World Wildlife Fund (WWF) developed a system of eight biogeographic realms (ecozones):

- Nearctic – Biogeographic realm encompassing temperate North America 22.9 mil. km^{2} (including most of North America)
- Palearctic – Biogeographic realm covering most of Eurasia 54.1 mil. km^{2} (including the bulk of Eurasia and North Africa)
- Afrotropical – One of Earth's eight biogeographic realms 22.1 mil. km^{2} (including Sub-Saharan Africa)
- Indomalayan – One of the Earth's eight ecozones 7.5 mil. km^{2} (including the South Asian subcontinent and Southeast Asia)
- Australasian – One of the Earth's eight biogeographic realms 7.7 mil. km^{2} (including Australia, New Guinea, and neighbouring islands). The northern boundary of this zone is known as the Wallace line.
- Neotropical – One of Earth's eight biogeographic realms 19.0 mil. km^{2} (including South America and the Caribbean)
- Oceanian – Terrestrial biogeographic realm 1.0 mil. km^{2} (including Polynesia, Fiji and Micronesia)
- Antarctic – One of Earth's eight biogeographic realms 0.3 mil. km^{2} (including Antarctica).

=== Ecoregions ===
Ecoregion – Ecological and geographical area

The World has over 800 terrestrial ecoregions. See Lists of ecoregions by country.

== History of ecology ==
History of ecology

- History of human ecology

== General ecology concepts ==
- Ecological succession – Change of species in a region over time
  - Primary succession – Gradual growth and change of an ecosystem on new substrate
    - Pioneer species – First species to colonize or inhabit damaged ecosystems
    - Ruderal species – Plant species that is first to colonize disturbed lands
    - Supertramp – Animal with high dispersion among many different habitats
  - Secondary succession – Redevelopment of an ecology after an event that changes it radically
- Carrying capacity – Maximum population size of a species that an ecosystem can support
  - Ecological collapse – Ecological communities abruptly losing biodiversity, often irreversibly
- Competitive exclusion principle – Ecology proposition
- Ecological yield – Harvestable population growth in an ecosystem
- Autotroph – Organism type
- Bacteria – Domain of microorganisms
- Bioinvader – Organism occurring in a new habitat
- Biomass – Biological material from living or recently living organisms
- Biotic material – Any material originating from living organisms
- Carbon cycle – Natural processes of carbon exchange
- Climate – Long-term weather pattern of a region
- Ecological selection – Mechanism of evolution by differential reproduction
- Gaia hypothesis – Scientific hypothesis about Earth
- Natural resource – Resources that exist without actions of humankind
- Monoculture – Farms producing only one crop at a time
- Decomposition – Process of breaking down organic matter
  - Organic matter – Matter composed of organic compounds
- Inorganic substance – A substance lacking organic constituents
  - Detritus – Dead particulate organic material
  - Biodegradation – Decomposition by living organisms
- Ecological crisis – Change to the environment that destabilizes the continued survival of a population
- Ecological extinction – Ecology term
- Ecophagy – Literal consumption of an ecosystem
- Ecological niche – Fit of a species living under specific environmental conditions
- Niche differentiation – The process by which competing species use the environment differently in a way that helps them to coexist.
- Biological interaction – Effect that organisms have on other organisms
  - Neutralism – A relationship between two species that interact but do not affect each other
  - Amensalism – Ecological interaction between taxa
  - Ecological facilitation – Type of species interaction
    - Mutualism – Mutually beneficial interaction between species
    - Commensalism – Beneficial symbiosis between species
  - Coexistence theory – A framework to understand and explain how ecologically similar species can coexist without competitively excluding each other
  - Competition – Type of species interaction
  - Predation – Biological interaction
  - Parasitism – Type of interaction between species
- Sexecology – Activism based around ecofetishism

== See also ==
- Bibliography of ecology – List of publications on the topic of biology
- Biology – Scientific study of life
  - Outline of biology
  - Index of biology articles
