= Elise Zipkin =

Elise F. Zipkin
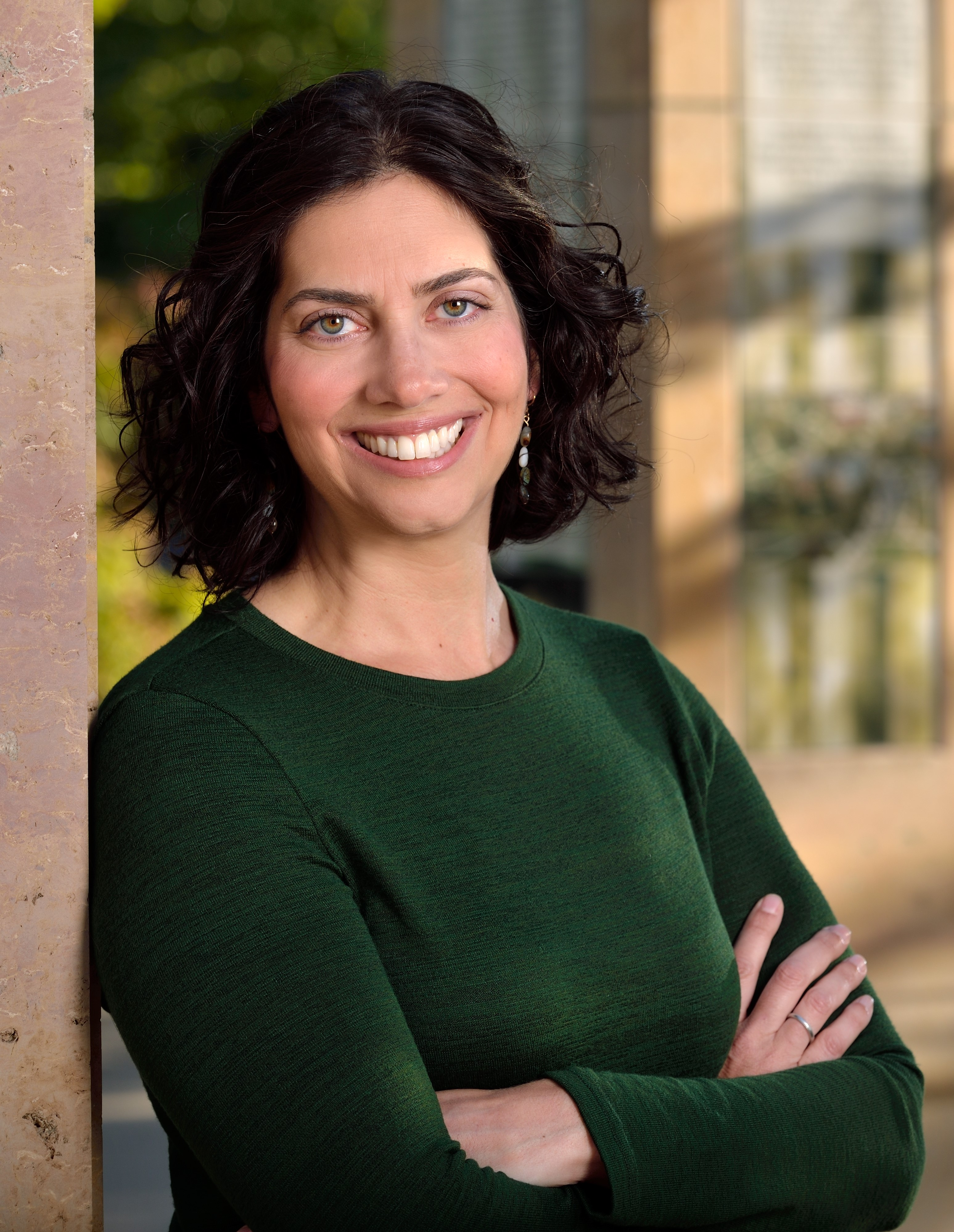
- Education: University of Maryland; Cornell University; University of Michigan
- Scientific career
- Workplaces: Michigan State University; United States Geological Survey
- Thesis: Hierarchical models for analysis of species distributions and abundances: Development and applications (2012)
- Doctoral advisor: William Fagan; J. Andrew Royle
- Website: zipkinlab.org//

Elise F. Zipkin is a Red Cedar Distinguished Professor at Michigan State University. She is also the Director of the Ecology, Evolution, and Behavior (EEB) Program there. Her research in quantitative ecology focuses on understanding the distribution and abundance of biodiversity in response to environmental factors, including climate change and other types of natural and human disturbance.

== Education ==
Zipkin graduated from Walnut Hills High School in Cincinnati, OH. She received B.S. degrees in mathematics and applied ecology from the University of Michigan in 2003 and an M.S. in natural resources from Cornell University in 2008. In 2012, Zipkin completed her Ph.D. in biology at the University of Maryland under the guidance of William Fagan and J. Andrew Royle. Her dissertation was on the development and application of hierarchical models to study the dynamics of animal populations and communities.

== Career ==
Zipkin worked as a quantitative ecologist for the United States Geological Survey from 2008-2013 and was a fellow at the John Wesley Powell Center for Analysis and Synthesis from 2012-2013. She joined the Department of Integrative Biology at Michigan State University in 2014, becoming a Red Cedar Distinguished Professor in 2024. In 2020, Zipkin was named the director of the EEB Program at MSU. Zipkin served as the chair of the Statistical Ecology Section of the Ecological Society of America from 2017-2018. She has been a subject matter editor at the Journal of Animal Ecology since 2019 and the statistical report editor at Ecology since 2023.

== Research ==
Zipkin’s research aims to understand, predict, and protect biodiversity in a changing world. The statistical models developed by Zipkin and her team have been used to reveal factors contributing to butterfly declines, the cascading effects of amphibian die-offs from the fungal pathogen Batrachochytrium dendrobatidis, and the role that wildlife conservation can play in reversing declines of endangered species. She has contributed to the open science movement by publishing reproducible software code for her projects since 2014, and by sharing the process of transparency with other scientists.

== Awards ==
Zipkin was named an Early Career Fellow by the Ecological Society of America in 2017 for “outstanding contributions to the fields of applied ecology and conservation biology through her work developing hierarchical statistical models to assess the trajectories, dynamics, and optimal management of wildlife populations and communities”. In 2022, she was awarded a fellowship from the Fulbright Program to work with colleagues at Tel Aviv University to build statistical modeling capacity in the biological sciences in Israel. Zipkin received the International Recognition of Professional Excellence Prize from the International Ecology Institute in 2023, with the awards jury stating: "She has substantially contributed to new analytical frameworks for quantifying organism abundance in time and space, measuring community diversity, and improving how ecologists combine information to create models for the management of threatened and harvested species.” In 2024, Zipkin was appointed a Red Cedar Distinguished Professor at Michigan State University, one of the university’s highest faculty honors recognizing outstanding research and scholarly achievement. Zipkin was named a Fellow of the American Association for the Advancement of Science (AAAS) in 2025.
