= Festival =

Organised series of acts and performances

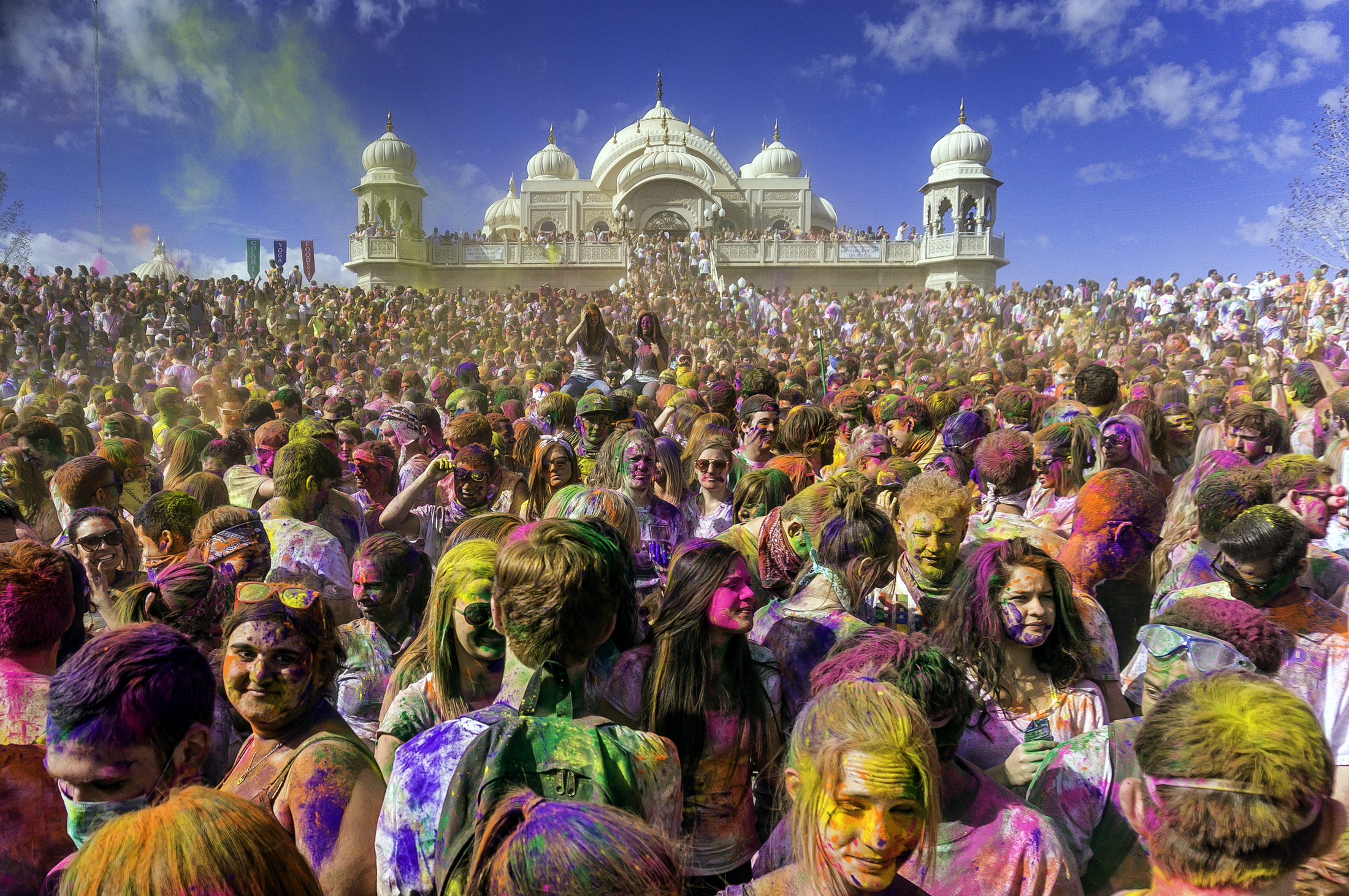
The Hindu festival of Holi at Sri Sri Radha Krishna Temple in Spanish Fork, Utah, United States.

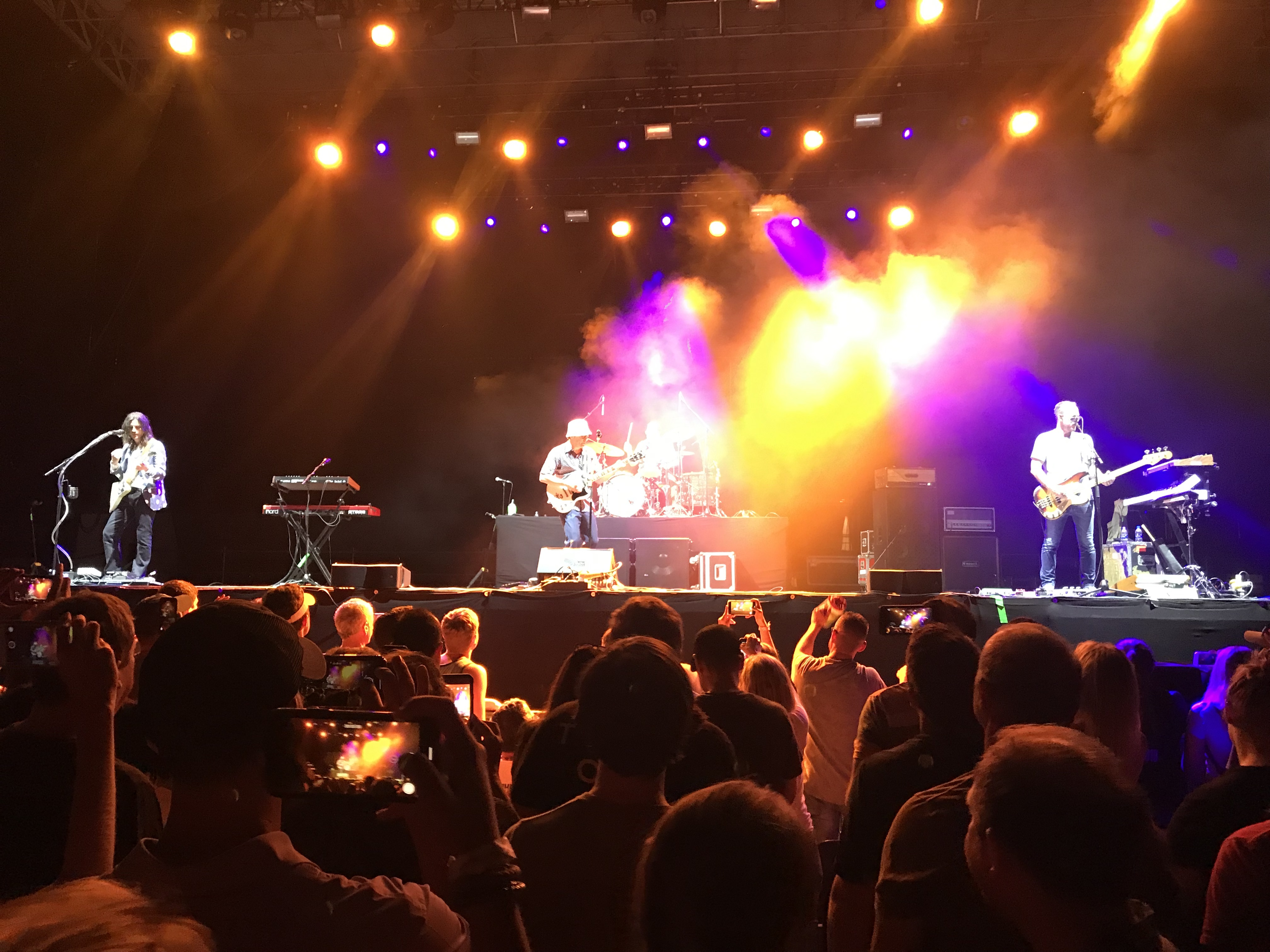
Musikfest, an eleven-day outdoor music festival held annually each August in Bethlehem, Pennsylvania, is the largest free music festival in the United States, drawing over 1.3 million attendees.

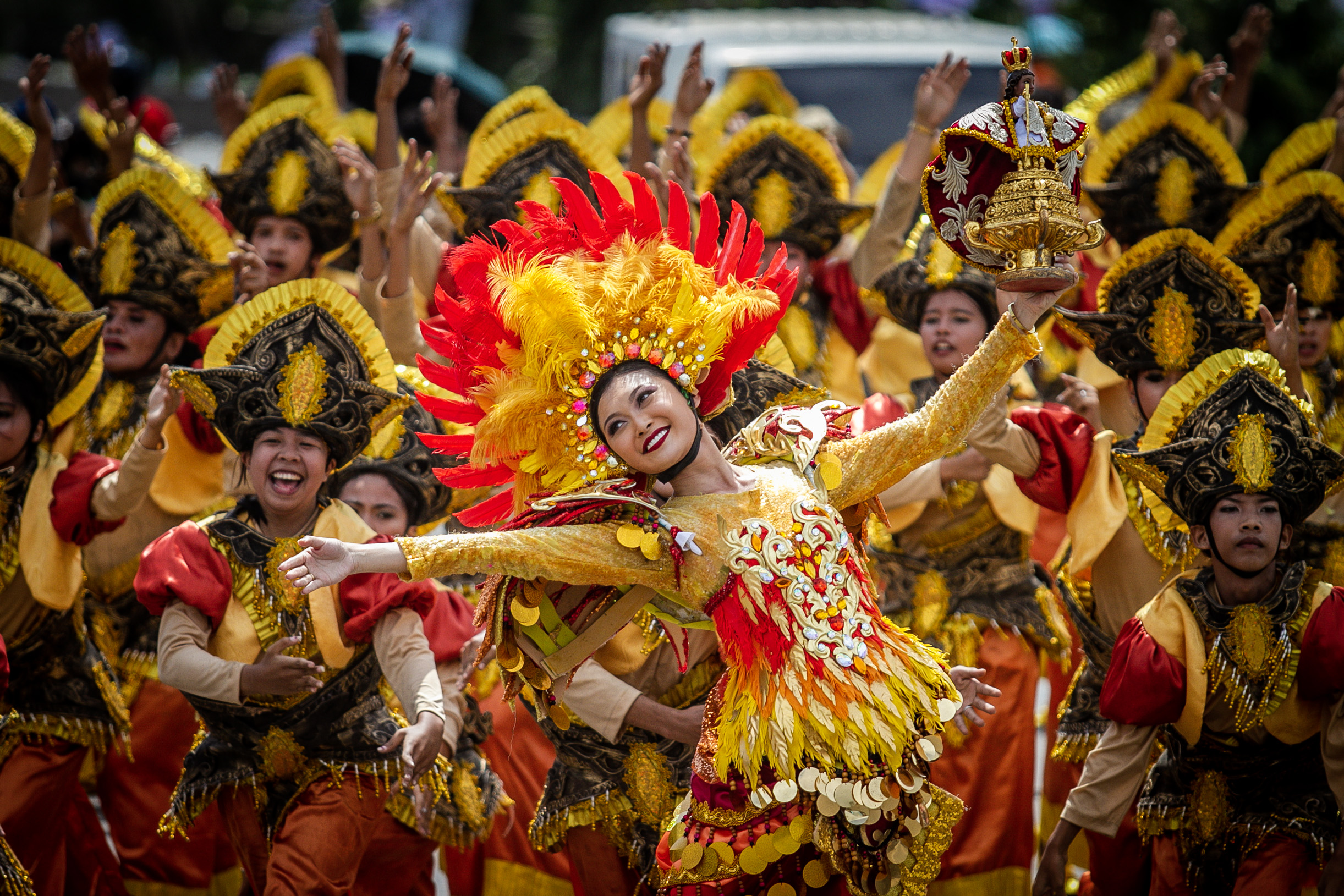
Sinulog Festival is the one entitled of the “Grandest Festival of the Philippines” and which estimated over 4 million attendees.

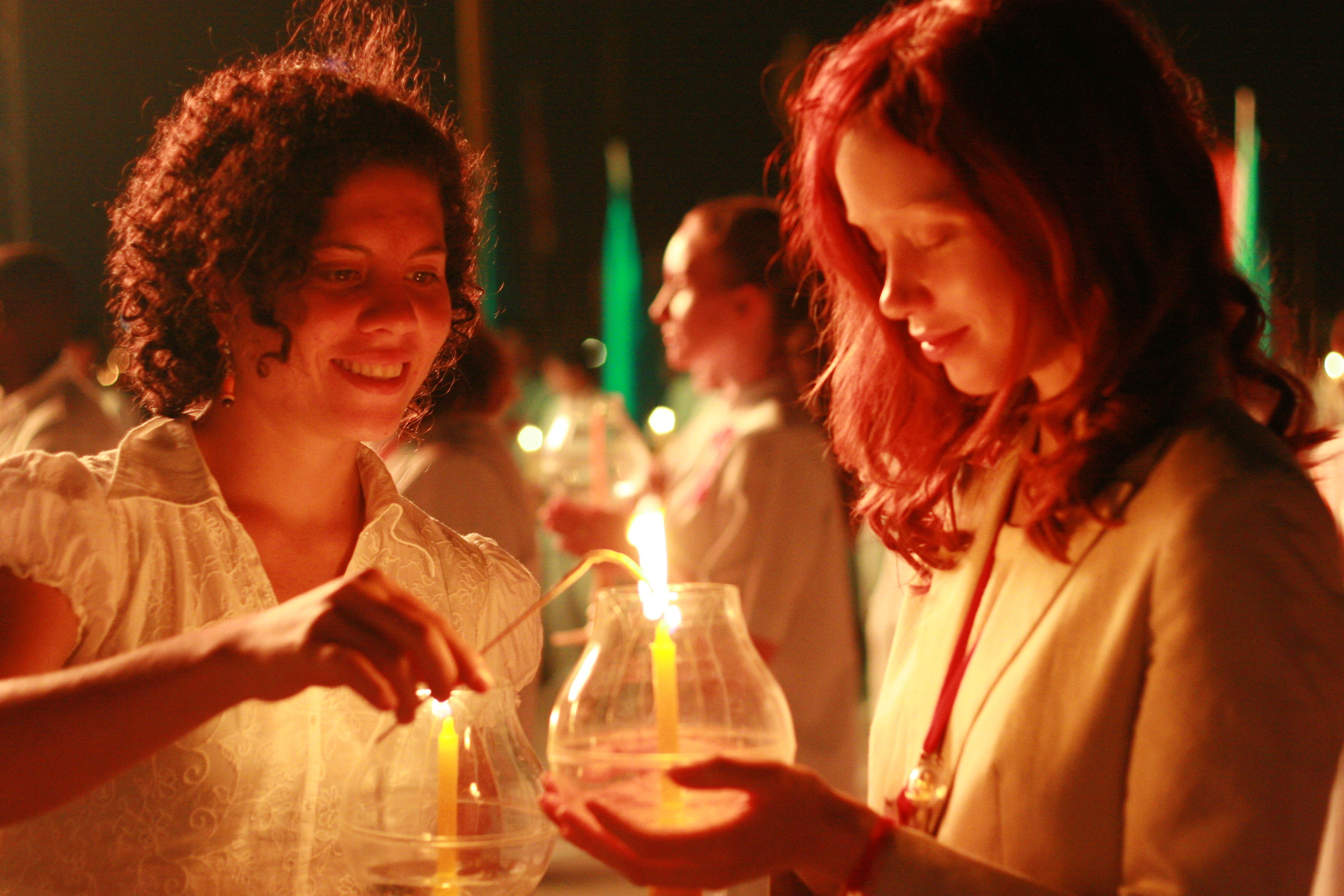
Buddhist festival of Magha Puja celebration held in Thailand.

A festival is an event celebrated by a community and centred on one or more characteristic aspects of its religion, traditions or cultures. It is often observed as an indigenous or national holiday, a religious celebration, or a cultural fair (mela). A festival is a typical case of glocalization, and also reflects the high culture-low culture interrelationship. In addition to religion and folklore, a significant source for festivals has been agriculture. Since, food is such an essential resource, many festivals are associated with harvest time. Religious observances and thanksgiving for good harvests are integrated into celebrations that take place in autumn, such as Halloween in the Northern Hemisphere and Easter in the Southern Hemisphere.

Festivals often serve to fulfill specific communal purposes, especially with regard to commemoration or giving thanks to gods, goddesses or saints: they are called patronal festivals. They may also provide entertainment, which was particularly important to local communities before the arrival of mass-produced entertainment. Festivals that focus on cultural or ethnic topics also seek to inform community members of their traditions; the involvement of elders sharing stories and experience provides a means for unity among families. Attendees of festivals are often motivated by a desire for escapism, socialization and camaraderie; such gathering have been seen as a means of fostering connection, belonging and adaptability across geographical boundaries.

== Etymology ==
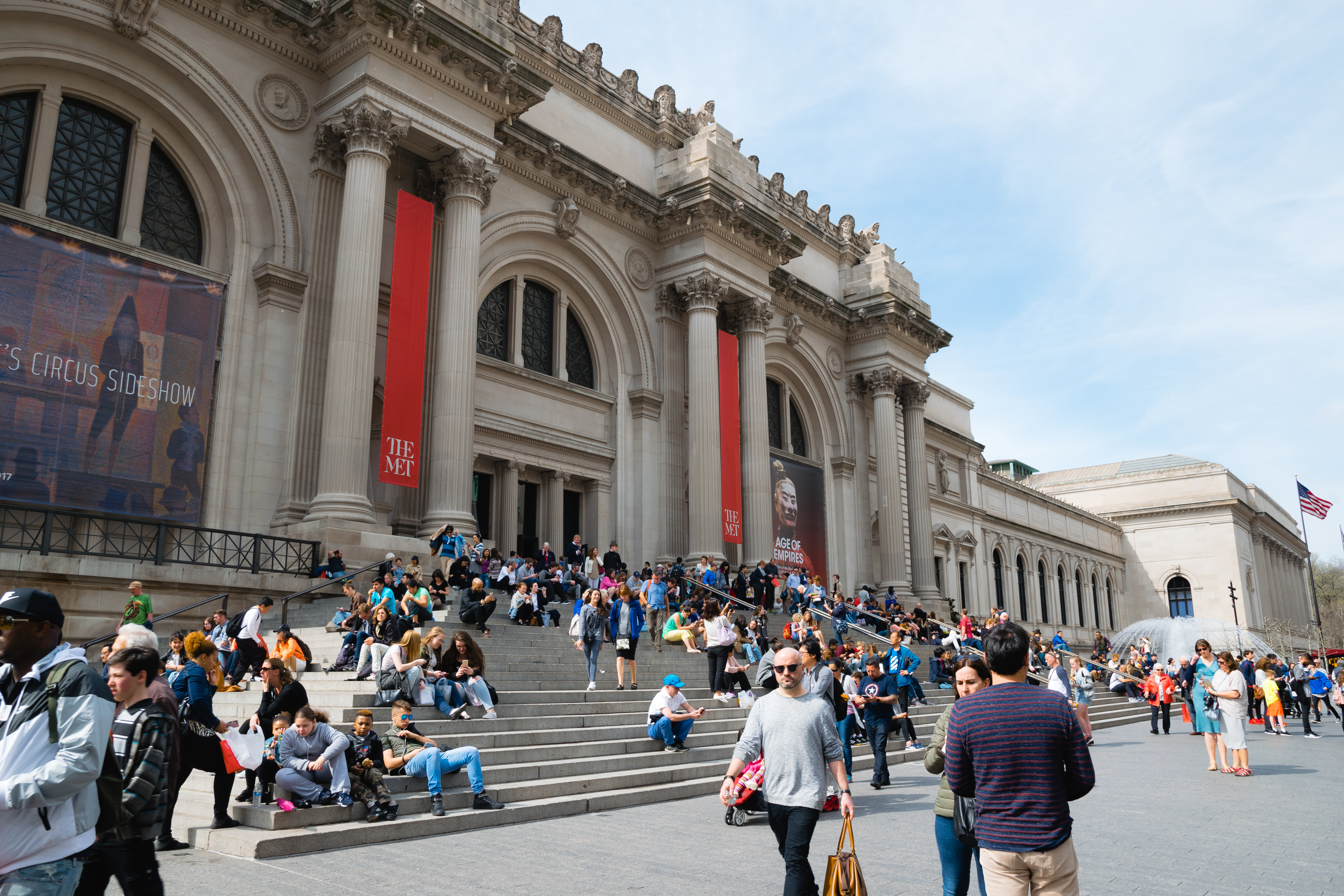
The annual Met Gala at the Metropolitan Museum of Art in Manhattan is an haute couture festival celebrating the global fashion industry.

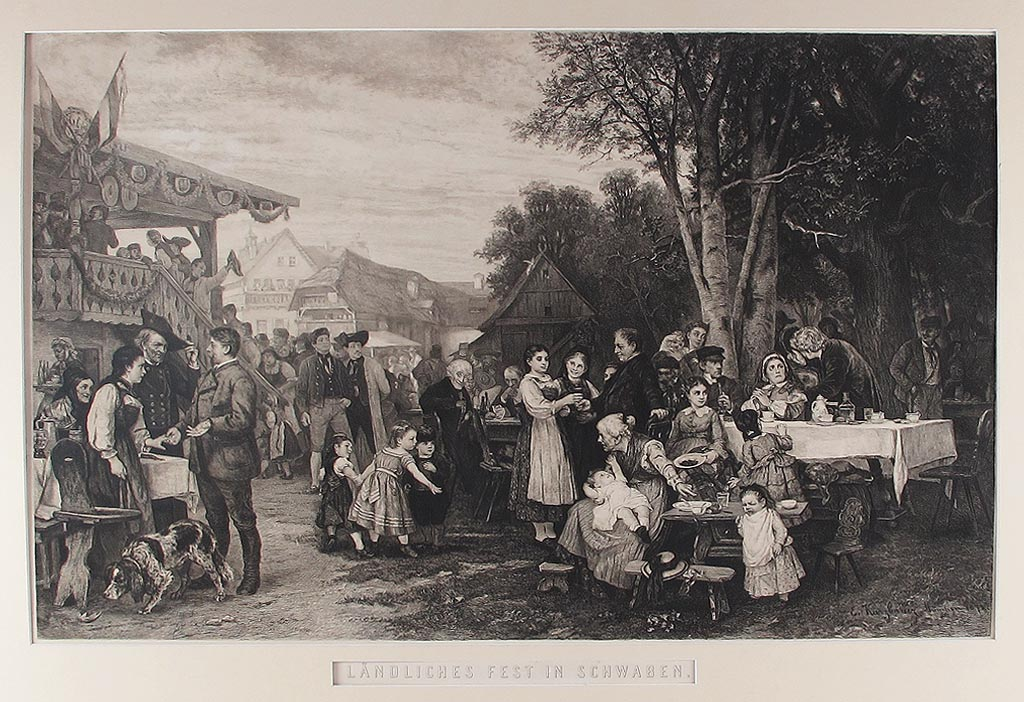
A country festival in Swabia

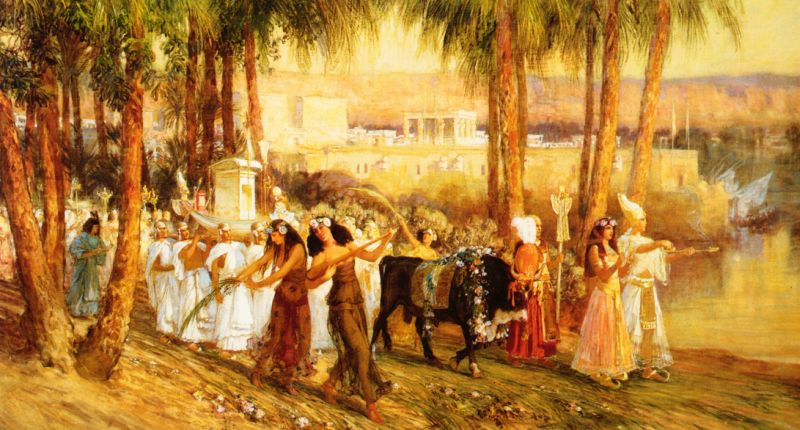
Procession in Honor of Isis, a 1903 depiction of the Egyptian Navigium Isidis festival by Frederick Arthur Bridgman

The word "festival" was originally used as an adjective from the late fourteenth century, obtained from Latin via Old French. In Middle English, a "festival dai" was a religious holiday.

The first recorded use of the word "festival" as a noun was in 1589 (as "Festifall"). Feast first came into usage as a noun c. 1200, and its first recorded use as a verb was circa 1300.

The word gala comes from Arabic word khil'a, meaning robe of honor. The word gala was formally used to describe "festive dress", but came to be a synonym of "festival" starting in the 18th century.

== History ==
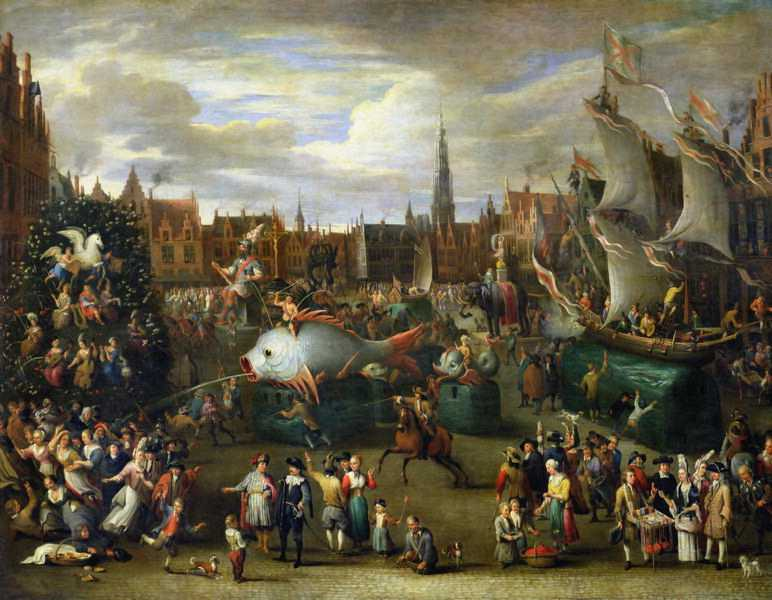
A festival at Antwerp, Belgium, in the 17th century

Festivals have been important in human culture and history for a long time, and are found in virtually all cultures. Their importance remains evident in both private and public life, as well as in religious and non-religious contexts.

Ancient Greek and Roman societies relied heavily upon festivals, both communal and administrative. Saturnalia was likely influential to Christmas and Carnival. Celebration of social occasions, religion and nature were common.

Specific festivals have century-long histories, and festivals in general have developed over the last few centuries – some traditional festivals in Ghana, for example, predate European colonisation of the 15th century. Festivals prospered following the Second World War.

Both established in 1947, Avignon Festival and the Edinburgh Festival Fringe have been remarkable in shaping the modern model of festivals. Art festivals became more prominent by the turn of the 21st century. In modern times, festivals are offered to the public as a global tourist attraction although they are commonly public or not-for-profit.

== Traditions ==
Many festivals have religious origins and entwine cultural and religious significance in traditional activities. The most important religious festivals such as Christmas, Rosh Hashanah, Diwali, Holi, Eid-al-Fitr and Eid-al-Adha serve to mark out the year. Others, such as harvest festivals, celebrate seasonal change. Events of historical significance, such as important military victories or other nation-building events also provide the stimulus for a festival. An early example is the festival established by Ancient Egyptian Pharaoh Ramesses III, celebrating his victory over the Libyans. In many countries, royal holidays commemorate dynastic events just as agricultural holidays are associated with harvests. Festivals are often commemorated annually.

There are numerous types of festivals in the world and most countries celebrate important events or traditions with traditional cultural events and activities. Most culminate in the consumption of specially prepared food (showing the connection to "feasting") and they bring people together. Festivals are also strongly associated with national holidays. Lists of national festivals are published to facilitate participation.

== Types of festivals ==
The scale of festivals varies; in location and attendance, they may vary from a local to national level. Music festivals, for example, often bring together disparate groups of people, making them both localised and global. The "vast majority" of festivals are, however, local, modest and populist. The abundance of festivals significantly hinders quantifying their total number. There is significant variation among festivals, beyond the binary dichotomies of sacred and secular, rural and urban, and people and establishment.

=== Religious festivals ===
Among many religions, a feast is a set of celebrations in honour of God or various deities. A feast and a festival are historically interchangeable. Most religions have festivals that occurs annually and some, such as Passover, Easter, and Eid al-Adha are moveable feasts – that is, those that are determined either by lunar or agricultural cycles or the calendar in use at the time. The Sed festival, for example, celebrated the thirtieth year of an Egyptian pharaoh's rule and then every three (or four in one case) years after that.

Among the Ashantis, most of their traditional festivals are linked to gazette sites which are believed to be sacred with several rich biological resources in their pristine forms. Thus, the annual commemoration of the festivals helps in maintaining the buoyancy of the conserved natural site, assisting in biodiversity conservation. Vodoun days is also one of the religious festivals of Benin which invites surrounding countries like Togo and Ghana because of the almost identical culture and tradition. Vodoun days is a festival of Vodoun. Even in Togo Godogbe za of Gblinkomegan is a traditional celebration based on ancestor worship.

In the Christian liturgical calendar, there are two principal feasts, properly known as the Feast of the Nativity of our Lord (Christmas) and the Feast of the Resurrection (Easter), but minor festivals in honour of local patron saints are celebrated in almost all countries influenced by Christianity. In the Catholic, Eastern Orthodox, Evangelical Lutheran and Anglican liturgical calendars there are a great number of lesser feasts throughout the year commemorating saints, sacred events or doctrines. Within Evangelical Lutheranism, "festival" is part of the ranking of feast days. In the Philippines, each day of the year has at least one specific religious festival, either from Catholic, Islamic, or indigenous origins.

Hindus celebrate many festivals, such as Navaratri, Holi, Rama Navami, Karva Chauth, Diwali, Pongal, Kartika Purnima; among others. Most Hindu festivals are not celebrated by all Hindus. One example of a Hindu festival is Ganesh Chaturthi, which is dedicated to the god Ganesha and is celebrated throughout India, but especially in Maharashtra. During the festival, idols of the god Ganesha, traditionally made of clay, are worshipped, and on the same day or after 1, 3, 5, 7, 10 or 11 days, are immersed in water. The public celebration of the festival, which includes a public procession, was promoted by Bal Gangadhar Tilak as a means of asserting and celebrating a Hindu nationalist identity and to provide a sense of Hindu solidarity during the British Raj in India.

Buddhist religious festivals, such as Esala Perahera are held in Sri Lanka and Thailand. The Sikh community celebrates the Vaisakhi festival marking the new year and birth of the Khalsa.

Religious festivals
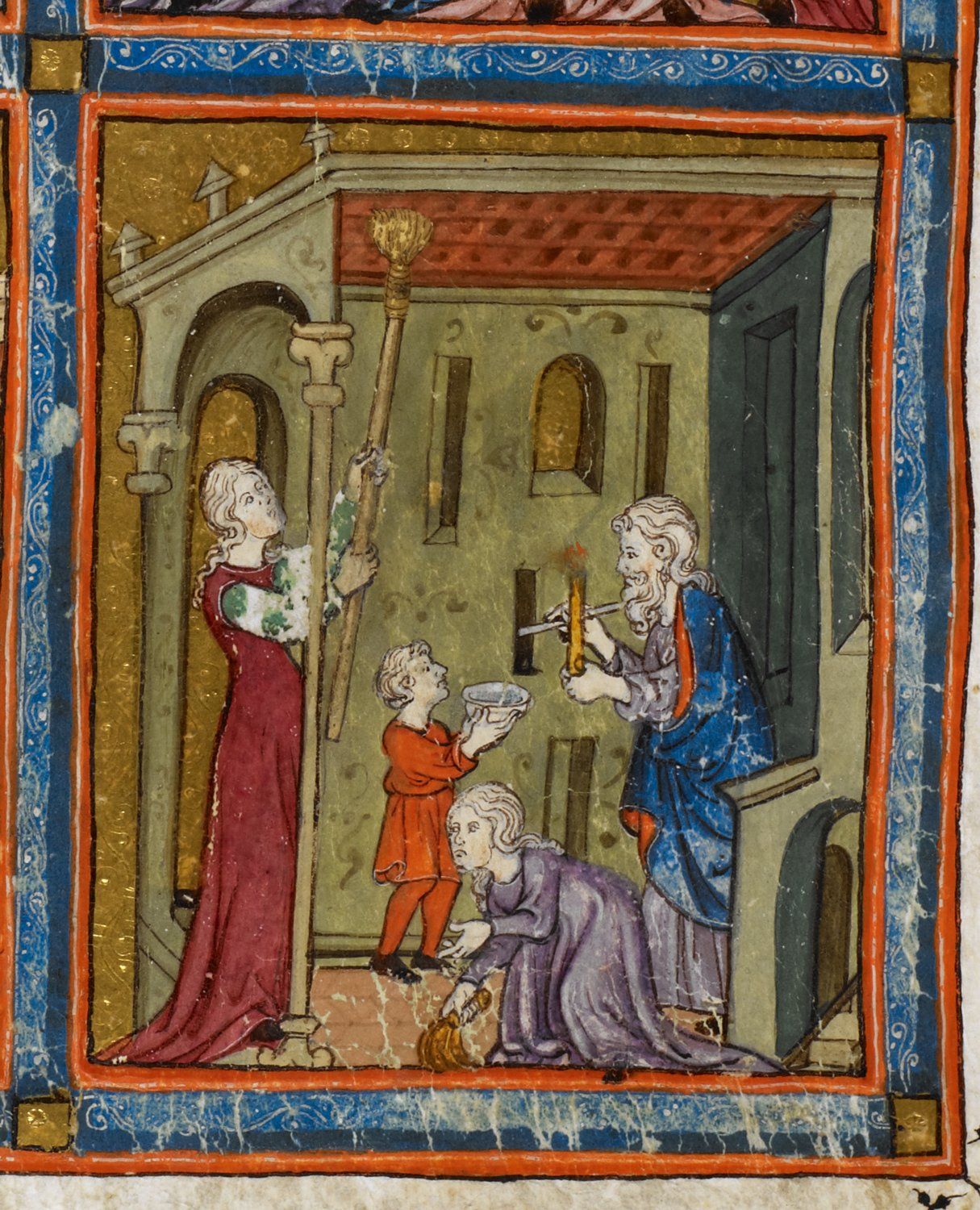
Cleaning in preparation for Passover (c. 1320)

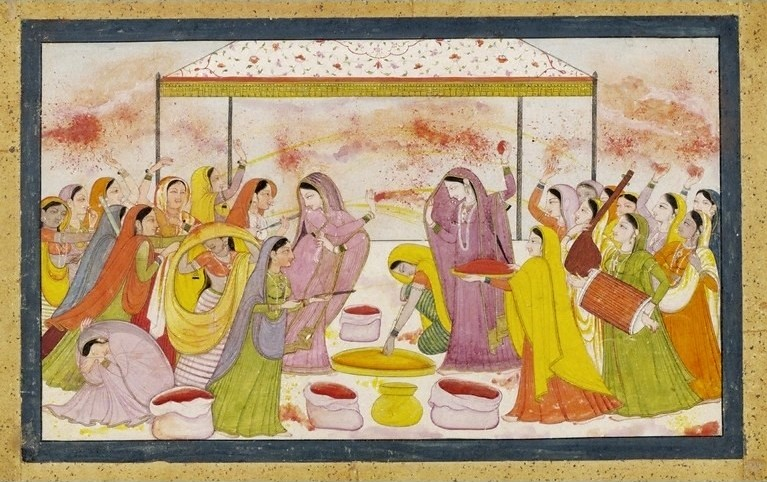
Radha celebrating Holi, Kangra, India (c1788)

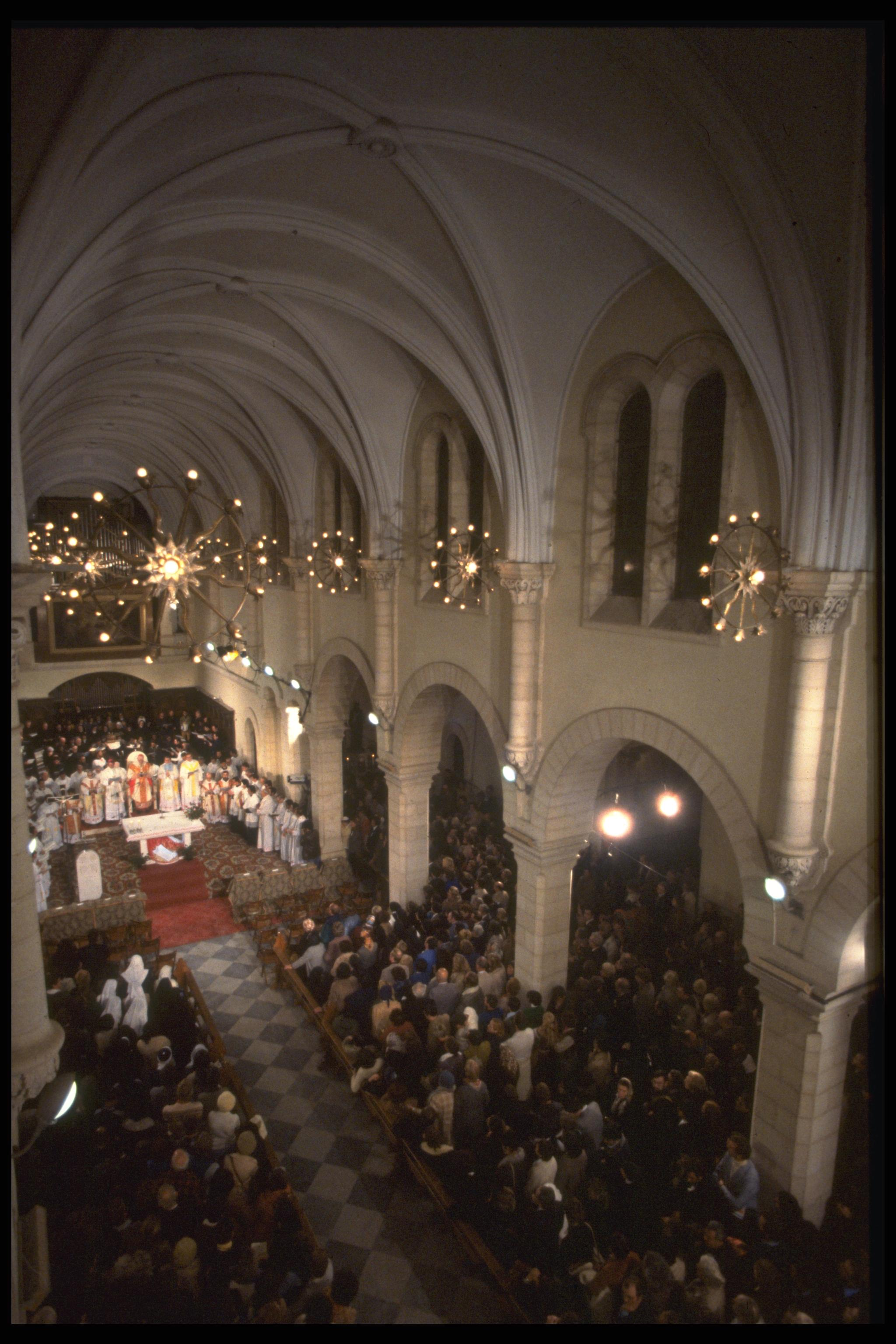
A Christmas mass at the Church of the Nativity, in Bethlehem, Palestine (1979)

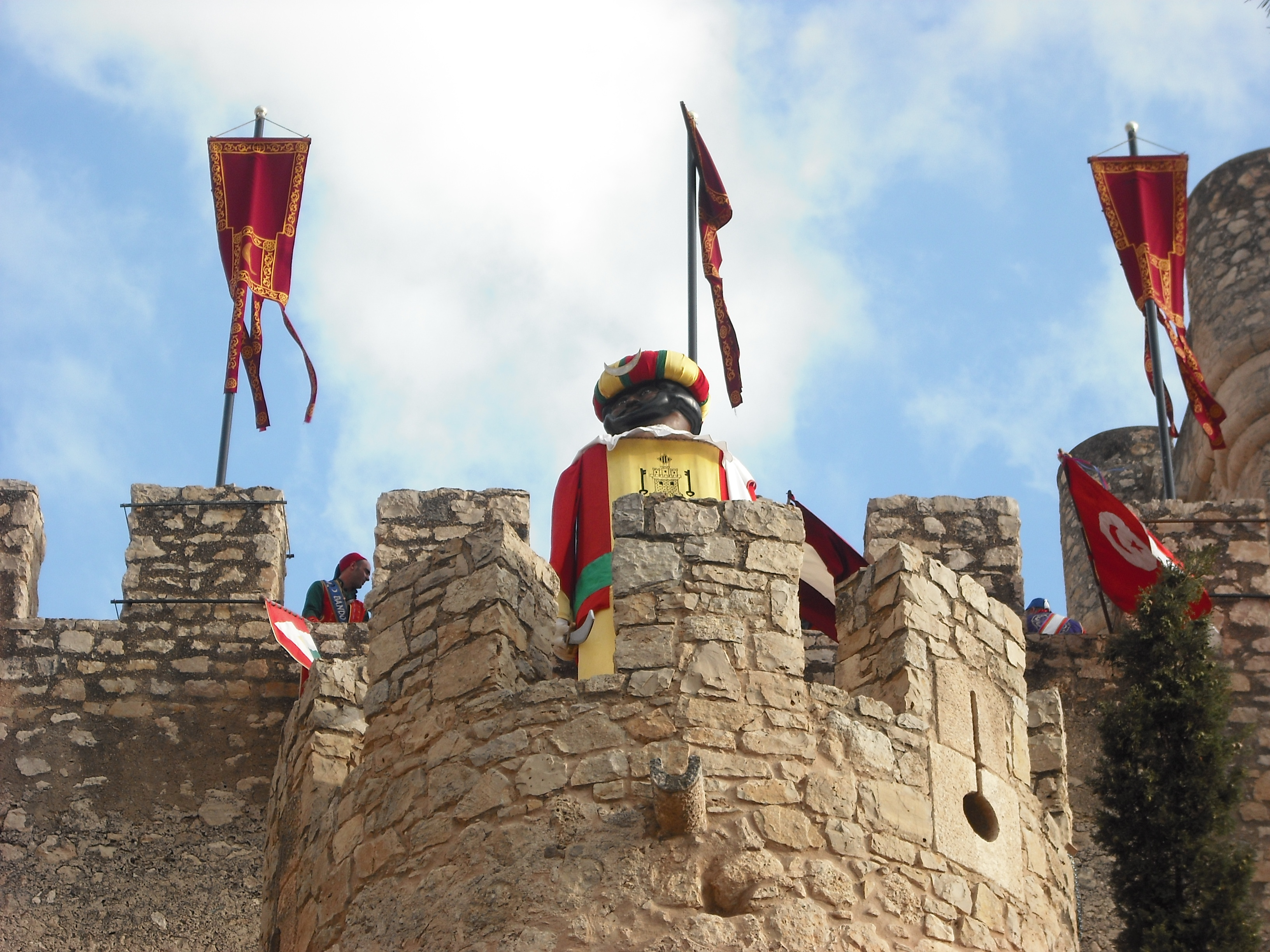
Moors and Christian festival in Villena, Spain

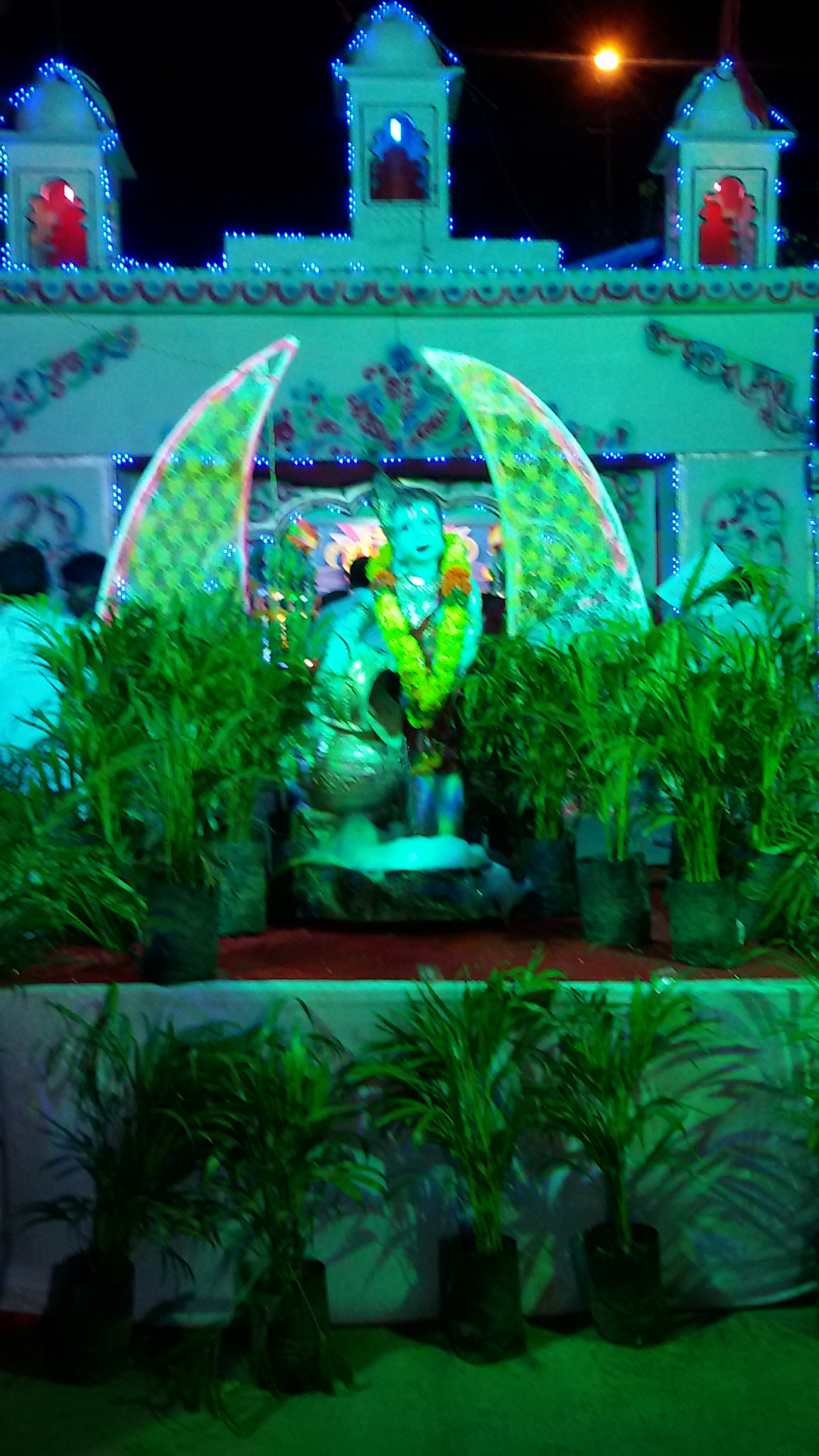
Decoration of god Krishna on Krishnastami in India.

South Asia's largest Eid al-Fitr Congregation held in Gor-e-Shahid Boro Math, Dinajpur, Bangladesh.

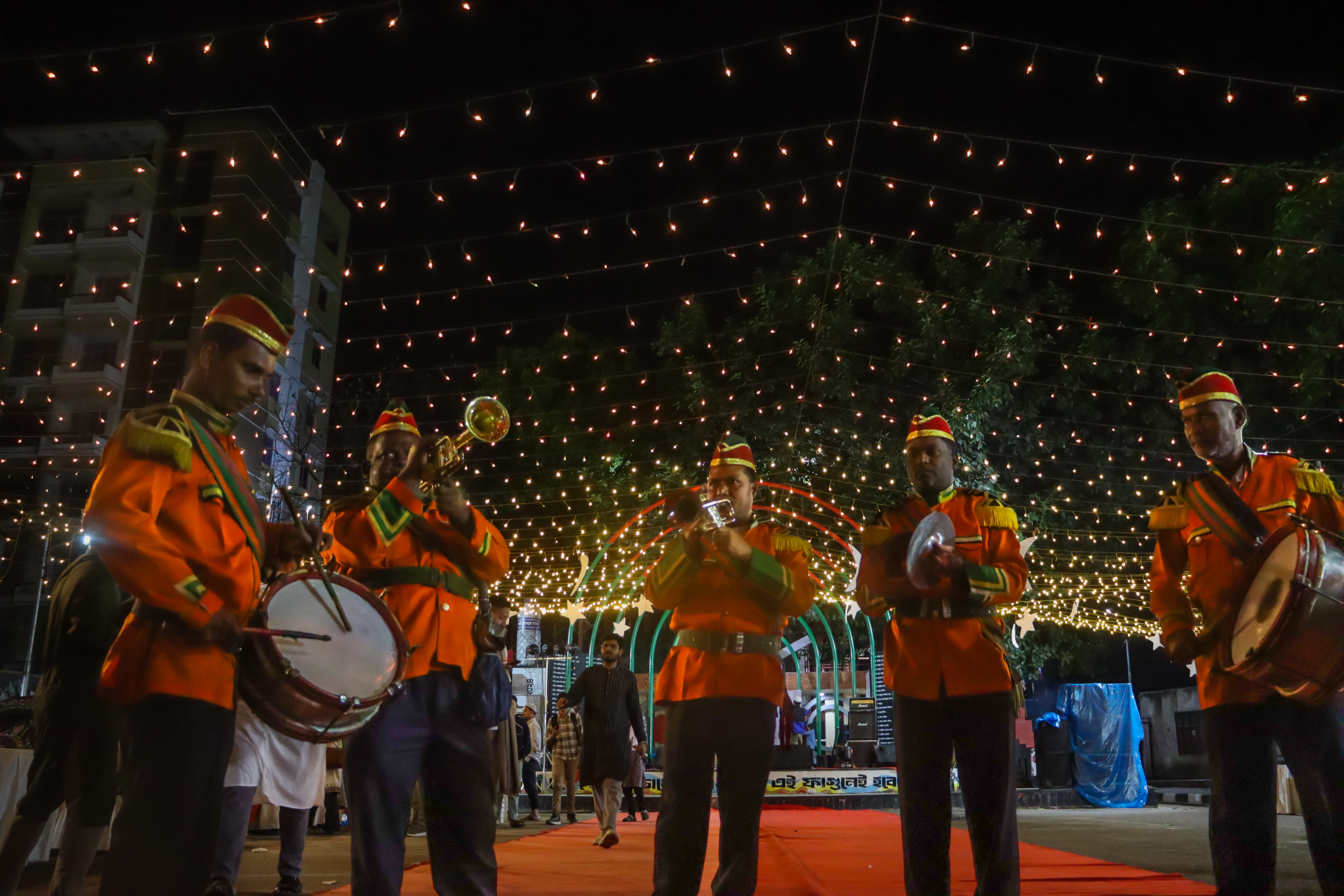
Eid al-Fitr festival at the Mugdho Mancha, Dhaka.

=== Arts festivals ===
Among the many offspring of general arts festivals are also more specific types of festivals, including ones that exhibit intellectual or creative achievement such as science festivals, literary festivals and music festivals. Sub-categories include comedy festivals, rock festivals, jazz festivals and buskers festivals; poetry festivals, theatre festivals, and storytelling festivals; and re-enactment festivals such as Renaissance fairs. In the Philippines, aside from numerous art festivals scattered throughout the year, February is known as national arts month, the culmination of all art festivals in the entire archipelago. The modern model of music festivals began in the 1960s-70s and have become a lucrative global industry. Predecessors extend back to the 11th century and some, such as the Three Choirs Festival, remain to this day.

Film festivals involve the screenings of several different films, and are usually held annually. Some of the most significant film festivals include the Berlin International Film Festival, the Venice Film Festival and the Cannes Film Festival.

Arts festivals
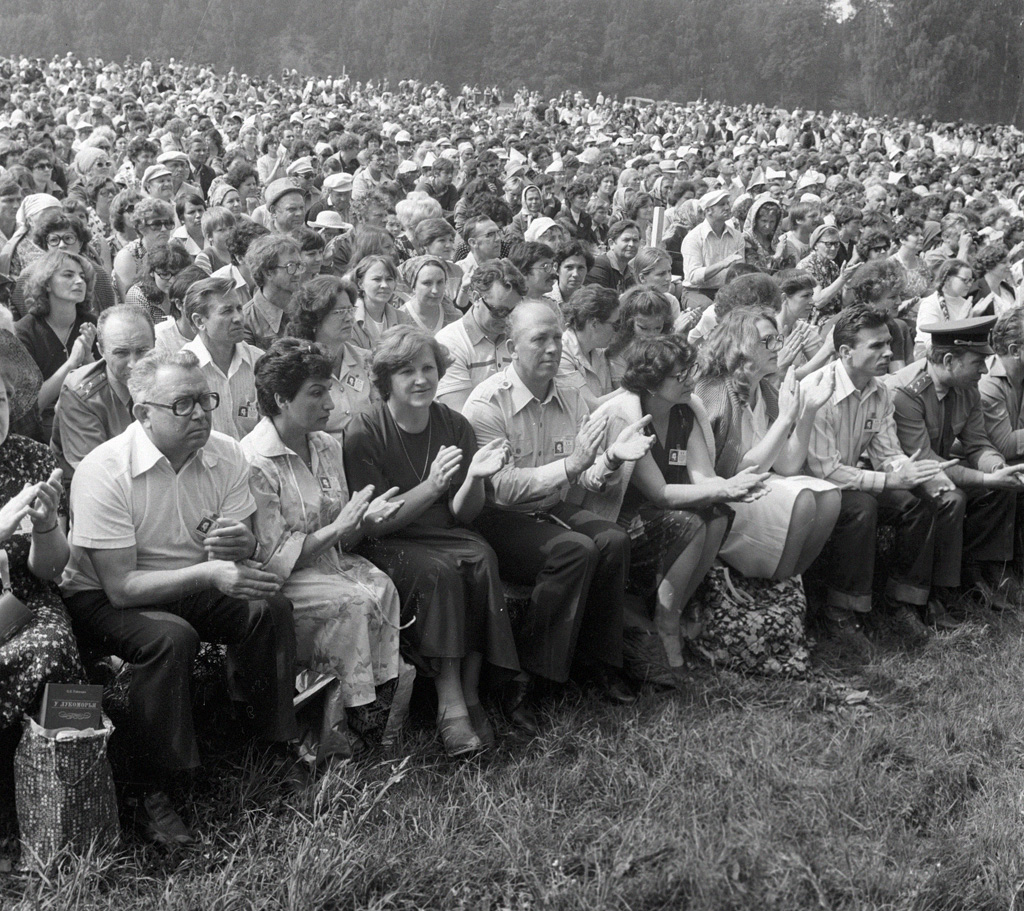
Pushkin Poetry Festival, Russia

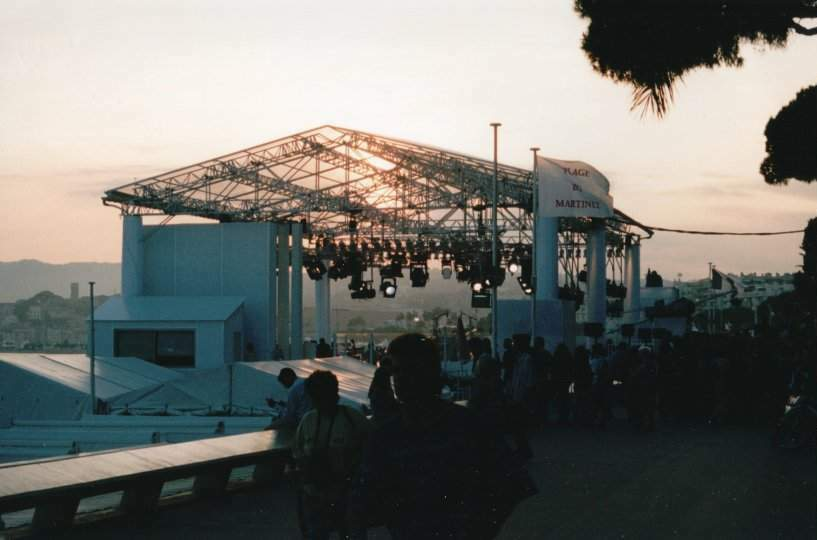
Television studio at the Hôtel Martinez during the Cannes Film Festival, France (2006)

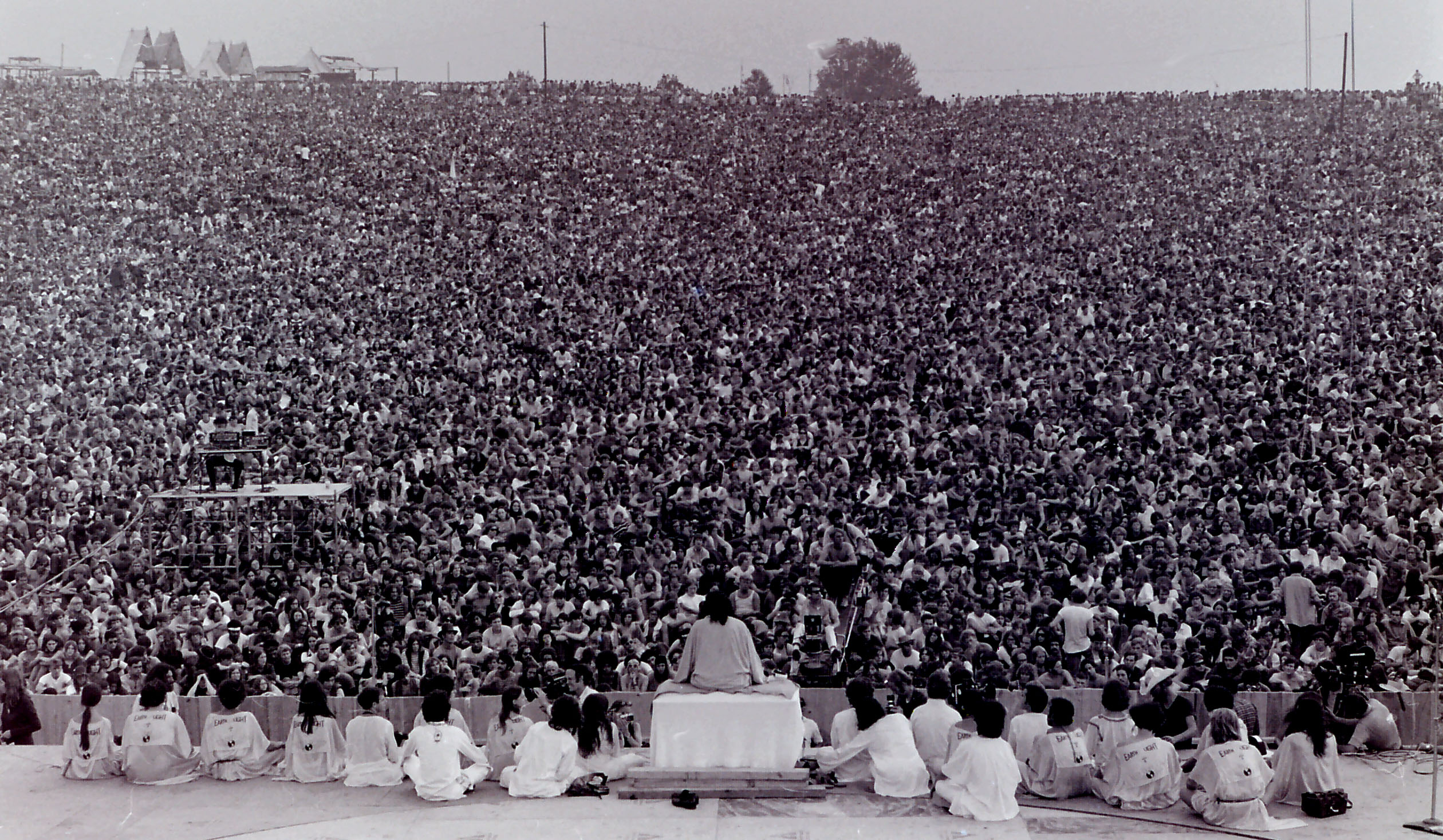
The opening ceremony at the Woodstock rock festival, United States (1969)

A food festival is an event celebrating food or drink. These often highlight the output of producers from a certain region. Some food festivals are focused on a particular item of food, such as the National Peanut Festival in the United States, or the Galway International Oyster Festival in Ireland. There are also specific beverage festivals, such as the famous Oktoberfest in Germany for beer. Many countries hold festivals to celebrate wine. One example is the global celebration of the arrival of Beaujolais nouveau, which involves shipping the new wine around the world for its release date on the third Thursday of November each year. Both Beaujolais nouveau and the Japanese rice wine sake are associated with harvest time. In the Philippines, there are at least two hundred festivals dedicated to food and drinks.

Food and drink festivals
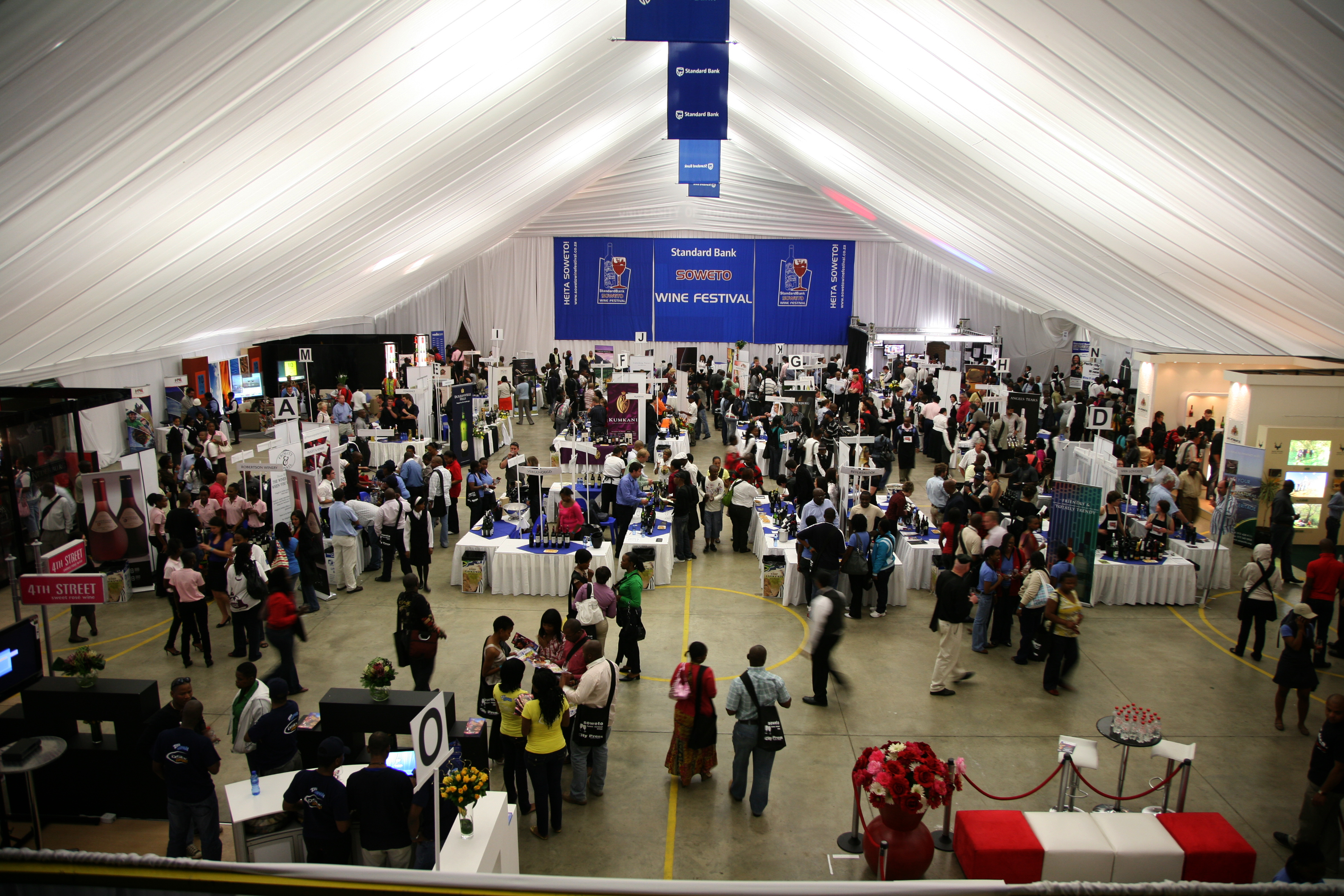
Soweto Wine Festival, South Africa (2009)

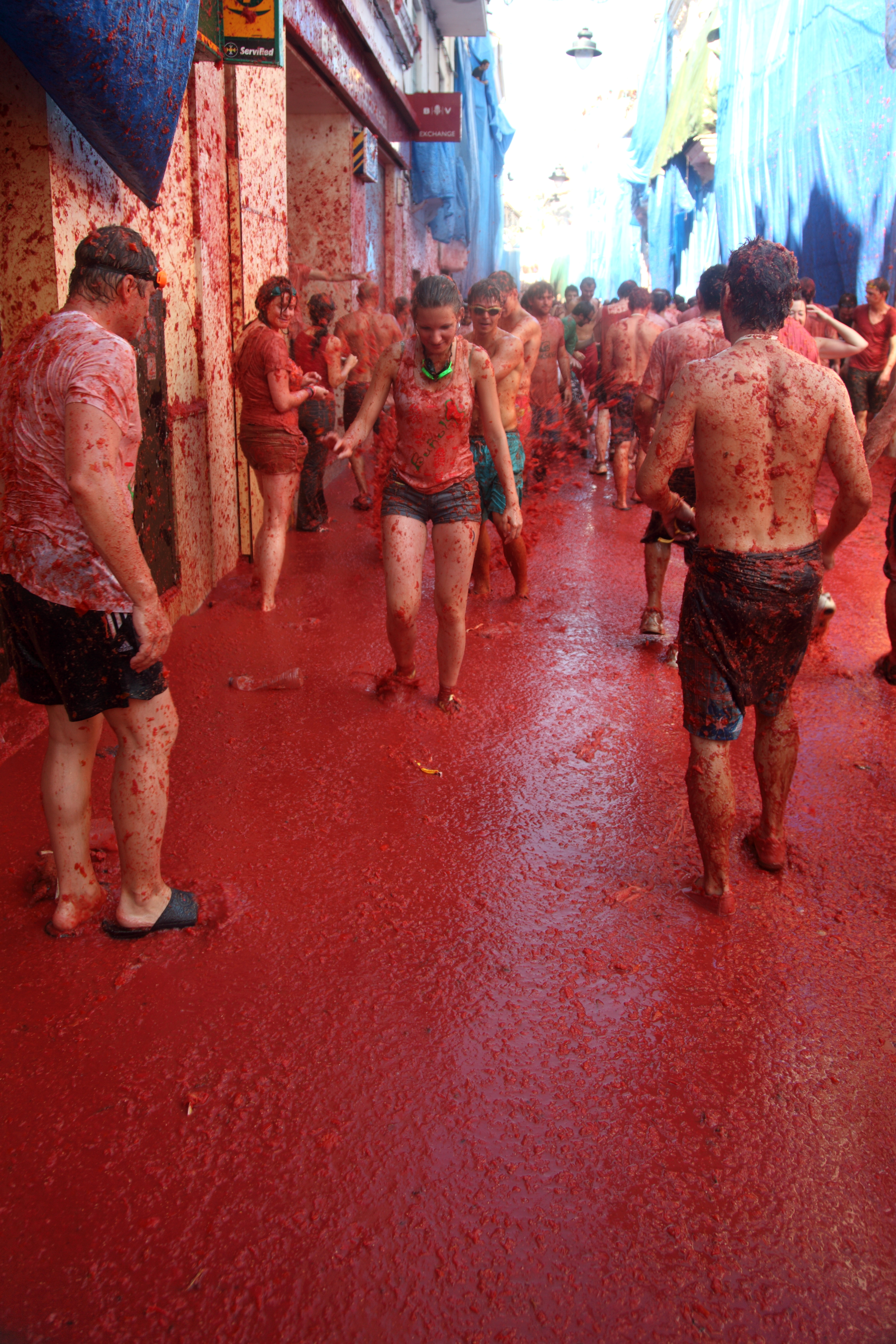
La Tomatina, Spain (2010)

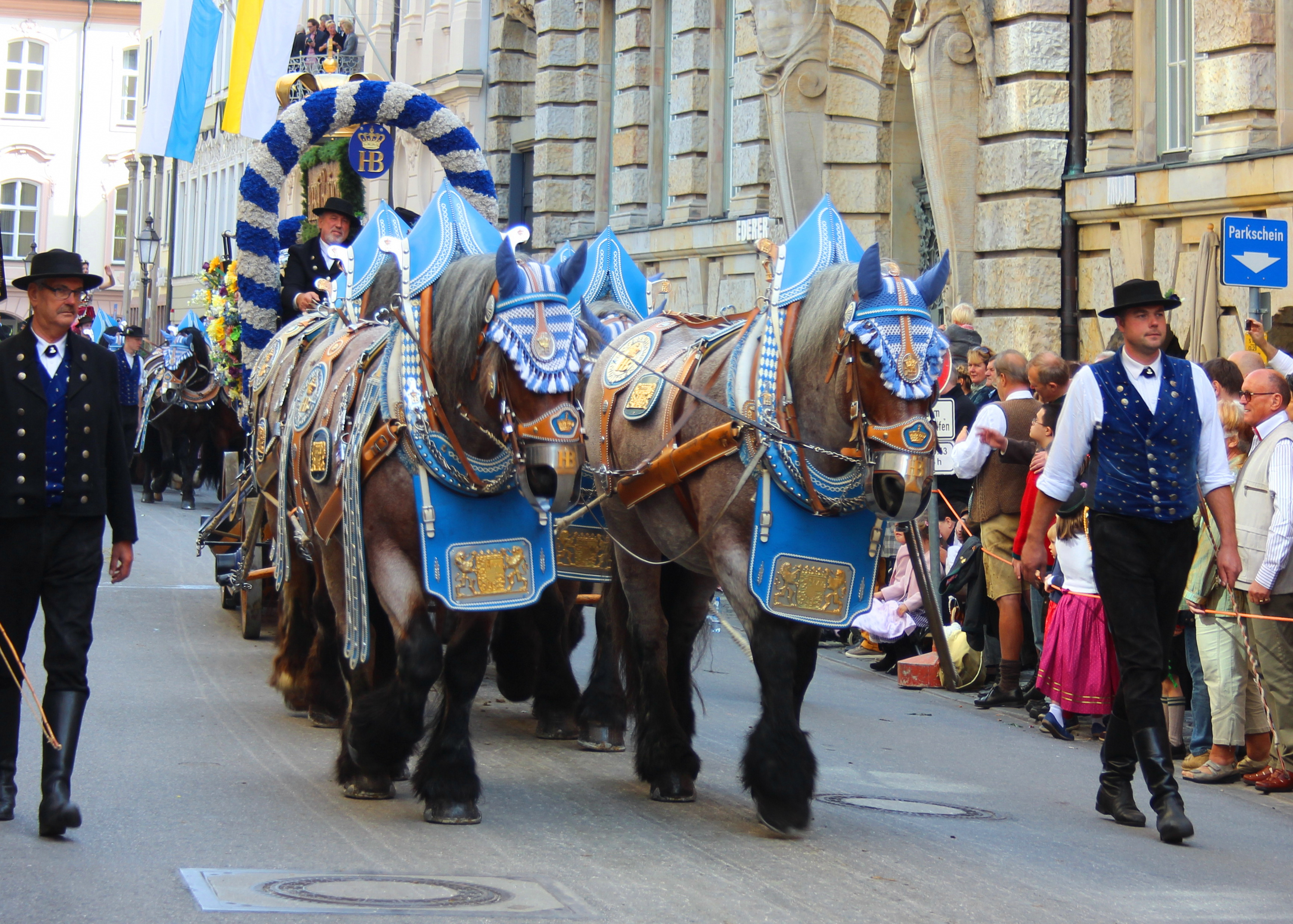
Beer horse cart from the Hofbräuhaus brewery at Oktoberfest Germany (2013)

=== Seasonal and harvest festivals ===
Seasonal festivals, such as Beltane, are determined by the solar and the lunar calendars and by the cycle of the seasons, especially because of its effect on food supply, as a result of which there is a wide range of ancient and modern harvest festivals. Ancient Egyptians relied upon the seasonal inundation caused by the Nile River, a form of irrigation, which provided fertile land for crops. In the Alps, in autumn the return of the cattle from the mountain pastures to the stables in the valley is celebrated as Almabtrieb. A recognized winter festival, the Chinese New Year, is set by the lunar calendar, and celebrated from the day of the second new moon after the winter solstice. Dree Festival of the Apatanis living in Lower Subansiri District of Arunachal Pradesh is celebrated every year from July 4 to 7 by praying for a bumper crop harvest.

Midsummer or St John's Day, is an example of a seasonal festival, related to the feast day of a Christian saint as well as a celebration of the time of the summer solstice in the northern hemisphere, where it is particularly important in Sweden. Winter carnivals also provide the opportunity to utilise to celebrate creative or sporting activities requiring snow and ice. In the Philippines, each day of the year has at least one festival dedicated to harvesting of crops, fishes, crustaceans, milk, and other local goods.

Seasonal and harvest festivals
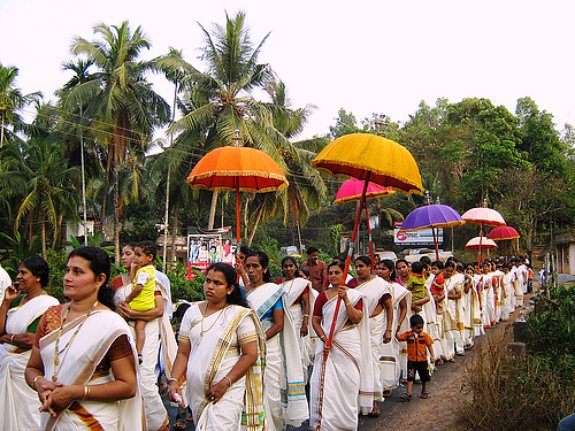
Temple Festival in India

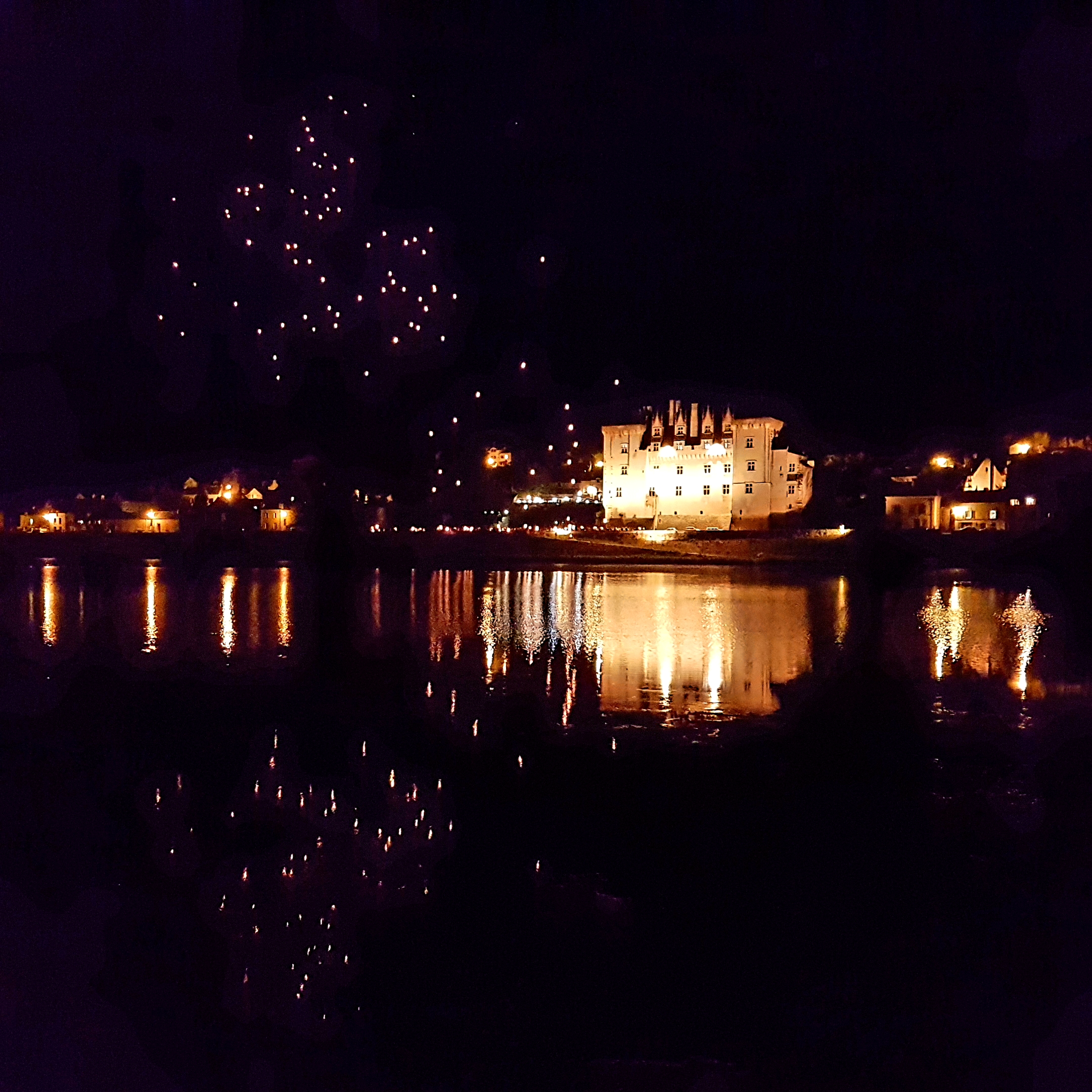
Château de Montsoreau-Museum of Contemporary Art Sky lantern Festival, in Loire Valley

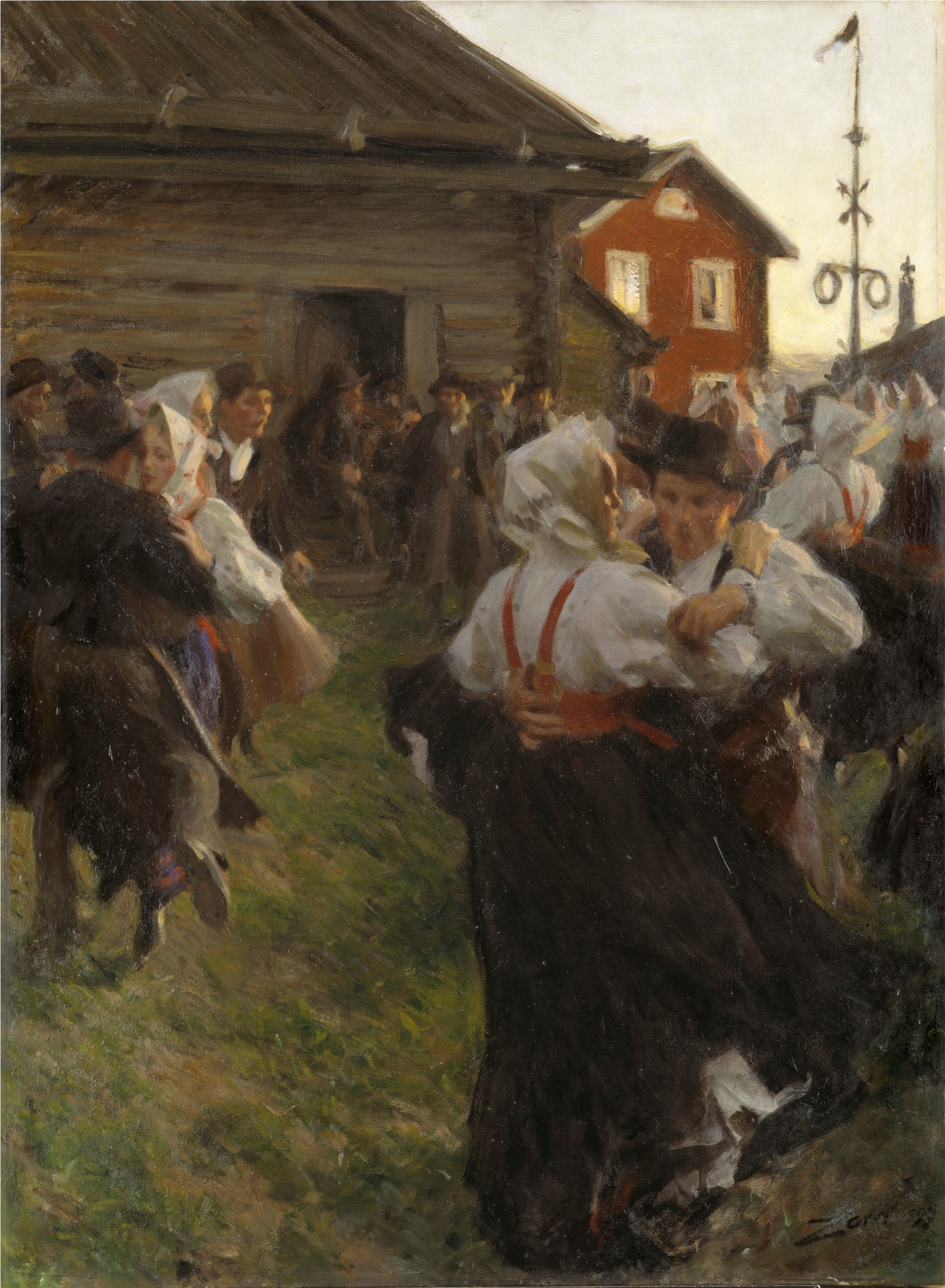
Midsummer dance by Anders Zorn, Sweden (1897)

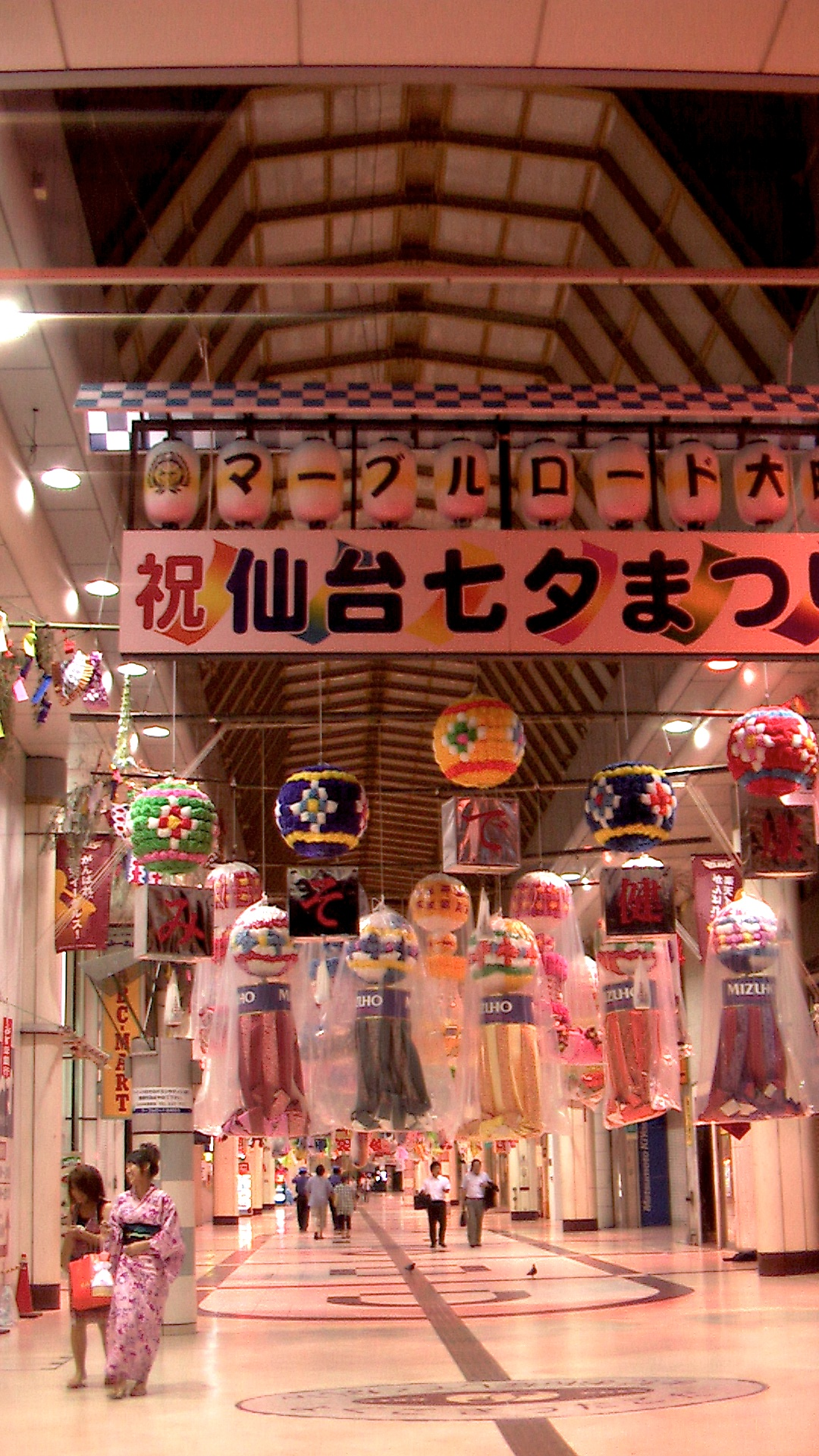
Tanabata summer festival in Sendai, Japan

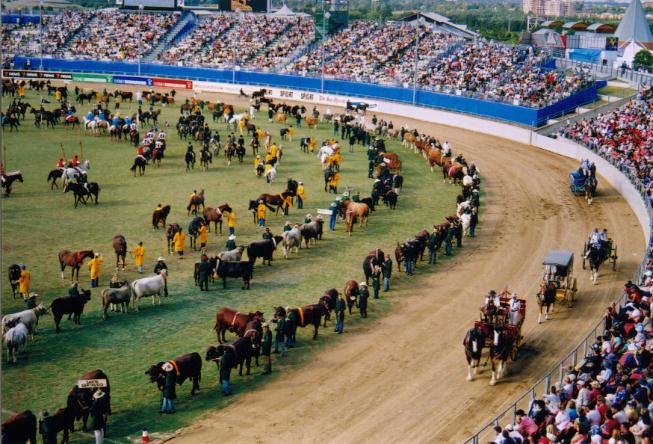
Grand Parade at the Sydney Royal Easter Show, Australia (2009)

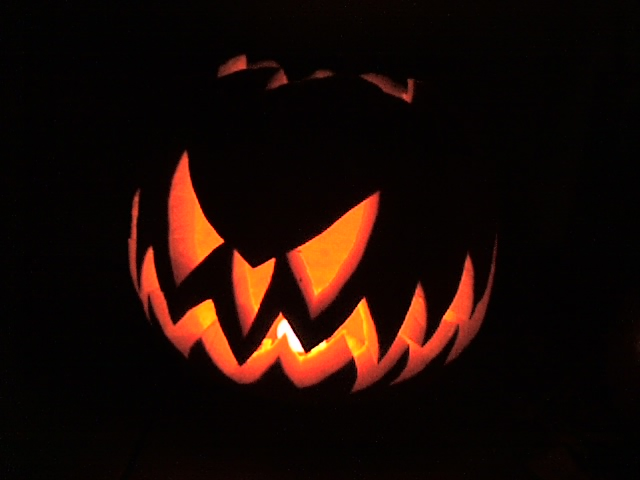
Halloween pumpkins show the close relationship between a harvest and religious festivals

== Effects ==
Scholarly literature notes that festivals functionally disseminate political values and meaning, such as ownership of place, which undergoes transformation in accordance with the festival. moreover, a festival may act as an antique which allows citizens to achieve "certain ideals", including those of identity and ideology. Festivals may be used to rehabilitate or elevate the image of a city; the ephemerality of festivals means that their impact is often incorporeal, of name, memory and perception. In deviating from routine, festivals may reinforce the convention, be it social, cultural or economic. Interventions can prevent alcohol-related crime and drug-facilitated sexual assaults at festivals.

== Study of festivals ==
- Festive ecology – explores the relationships between the symbolism and the ecology of the plants, fungi and animals associated with cultural events such as festivals, processions and special occasions.
- Heortology – the study of religious festivals. It was originally only used in respect of Christian festivals, but it now covers all religions, in particular those of Ancient Greece. See list of foods with religious symbolism for some topical overlap. [chirag]

== See also ==
- Convention
- Event planning
- Fair
- Festive ecology
- Holiday
- Lists of festivals
- Outline of festivals
- Patronal festival
- Procession
- Trade show
