= Thermal ecology =

Thermal ecology is the study of the interactions between temperature and organisms. Such interactions include the effects of temperature on an organism's physiology, behavioral patterns, and relationship with its environment. While being warmer is usually associated with greater fitness, maintaining this level of heat costs a significant amount of energy. Organisms will make various trade-offs so that they can continue to operate at their preferred temperatures and optimize metabolic functions. With the emergence of climate change scientists are investigating how species will be affected and what changes they will undergo in response.

== History ==
While it is not known exactly when thermal ecology began being recognized as a new branch of science, in 1969, the Savanna River Ecology Laboratory (SREL) developed a research program on thermal stress due to heated water previously used to cool nuclear reactors being released into various nearby bodies of water. The SREL alongside the DuPont Company Savanna River Laboratory and the Atomic Energy Commission sponsored the first scientific symposium on thermal ecology in 1974 to discuss this issue as well as similar instances and the second symposium was held the next year in 1975.

== Animals ==
Temperature has a notable effect on animals, contributing to body growth and size, and behavioral and physical adaptations. Ways that animals can control their body temperature include generating heat through daily activity and cooling down through prolonged inactivity at night. Because this cannot be done by marine animals, they have adapted to have traits such as a small surface-area-to-volume ratio to minimize heat transfer with their environment and the creation of antifreeze in the body for survival in extreme cold conditions.

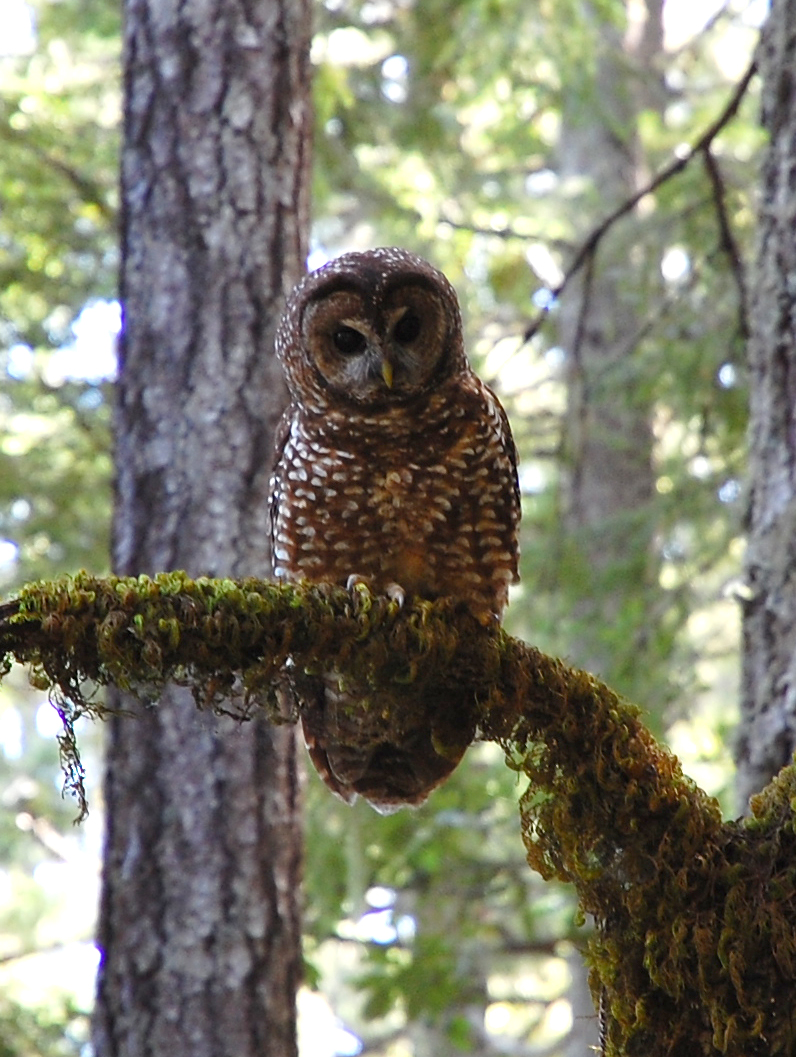
California spotted owl (Strix occdentalis)

=== Endotherms ===
Endotherms expend a large amount of energy keeping their body temperatures warm and therefore require a large energy intake to make up for it. There are several ways that they have evolved to solve this issue. For instance, following Bergmann's Rule, endotherms in colder climates tend to be larger than those in warmer climates as a way to conserve internal heat. Other methods include reducing internal temperatures and metabolic rates through daily torpor and hibernation.

==== Strix occidentalis ====
The Strix occidentalis, or the California spotted owl, has a preferred temperature range of around 18.20-35.20 °C and is less tolerant to heat than most other birds, exhibiting behaviors such as wing drooping and increased breathing at 30-34 °C. Because of this they tend to live in environments that are resistant to temperature change such as old-growth forests.

=== Ectotherms ===
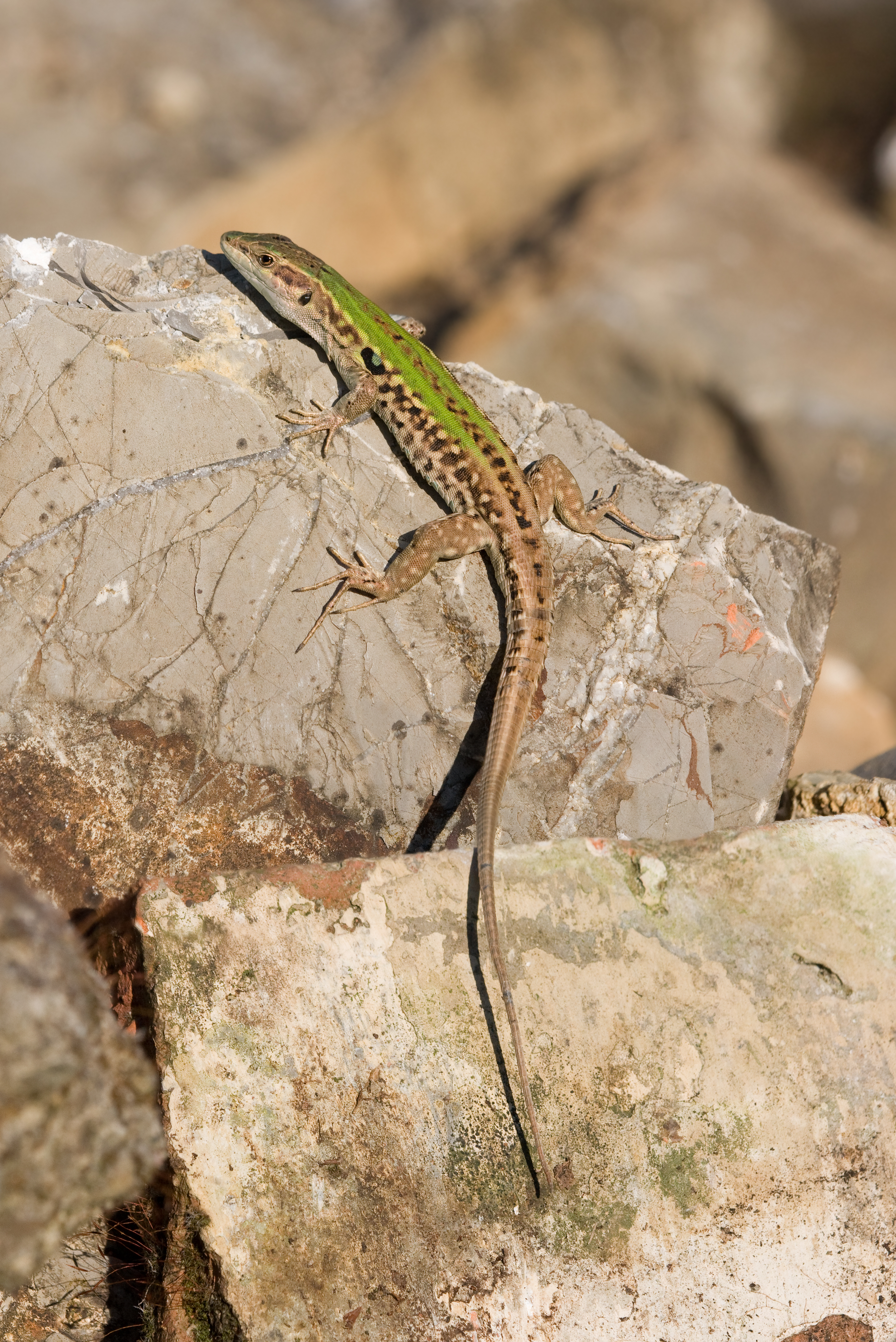
Italian wall lizard (Podarcis siculus)

Because the main source of heat for ectotherms comes from their environment, thermal requirements change from species to species depending on geographical location. Due to some species having a static preferred body temperature through generations, they are shown to exhibit behavioral adjustments in situations of drastic environment change with adjustments in physiology as a last resort. In addition, ectotherms, similarly to endotherms, are generally larger in size when living in colder climates, following the temperature-size rule.

==== Podarcis siculus ====
The Podarcis siculus otherwise known as the Italian wall lizard has a preferred temperature range of around 28.40-31.57 °C for both males and females. A strong direct relationship has been observed between their body temperatures and air temperature in the summer and a weak correlation has been observed in the spring. To control their internal temperature, seeking shade under rocks and leaves has proven to be effective.

== Plants ==
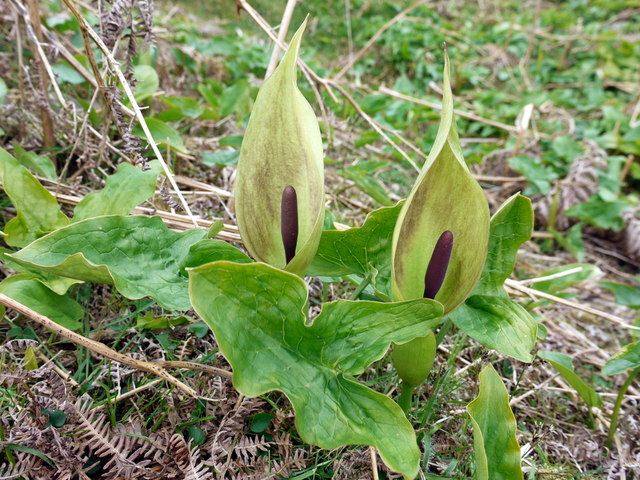
Jack in the Pulpit (Arum maculatum) can use thermogenesis to attract flies. They are then trapped and covered in pollen before being eventually released.

Many processes during plant reproduction operate at specific temperature ranges making temperature important for reproductive success. Increasing the temperature of the reproductive organs in plants results in more frequent visitations from pollinators and an increase in the rate of metabolic processes. Factors that affect the capture and maintaining of heat in plants include flower orientation, size and shape, coloration, opening and closure, pubescence, and thermogenesis.

== Climate change ==
Due to recent global climate change, thermal ecology has become a topic of interest for scientists concerning ecological response. Through observation it has been found that organisms typically respond to changes in weather and temperature by either moving to an environment in which these factors match what they are already accustomed to or staying in their current environment and consequently become acclimated to the new conditions. In a study of the fish species Galaxias platei, it was concluded that the direct impacts of climate change such as increased temperatures would most likely not pose a significant threat however indirect impacts such as habitat loss may be detrimental.

== See also ==
- Quantitative ecology
