= Quantitative ecology =

Quantitative ecology is the application of advanced mathematical and statistical tools to any number of problems in the field of ecology. It is a small but growing subfield in ecology, reflecting the demand among practicing ecologists to interpret ever larger and more complex data sets using quantitative reasoning. Quantitative ecologists might apply some combination of deterministic or stochastic mathematical models to theoretical questions or they might use sophisticated methods in applied statistics for experimental design and hypothesis testing. Typical problems in quantitative ecology include estimating the dynamics and status of wild populations, modeling the impacts of anthropogenic or climatic change on ecological communities, and predicting the spread of invasive species or disease outbreaks.

Quantitative ecology, which mainly focuses on statistical and computational methods for addressing applied problems, is distinct from theoretical ecology which tends to explore focus on understanding the dynamics of simple mechanistic models and their implications for a general set of biological systems using mathematical arguments.

== See also ==
- Taylor's law
- Theoretical ecology
- Thermal ecology

== Bibliography ==
- Matthiopoulos, J. 2011. How to be a Quantitative Ecologist. Wiley.
- Hilborn, R. and M. Mangel. 1997. The Ecological Detective: Confronting Models with Data. Princeton University Press.
- Mangel, M. 2006. The Theoretical Biologist's Toolbox. Quantitative Methods for Ecology and Evolutionary Biology. Cambridge University Press.
- Poole, R. 1974. Introduction to Quantitative Ecology. McGraw-Hill.
- Schneider, D. 1994, 2009. Quantitative Ecology: Spatial and Temporal Scaling. Academic Press.
- Turner, M. and R. Gardner (eds). 1991. Quantitative methods in landscape ecology. Springer.
