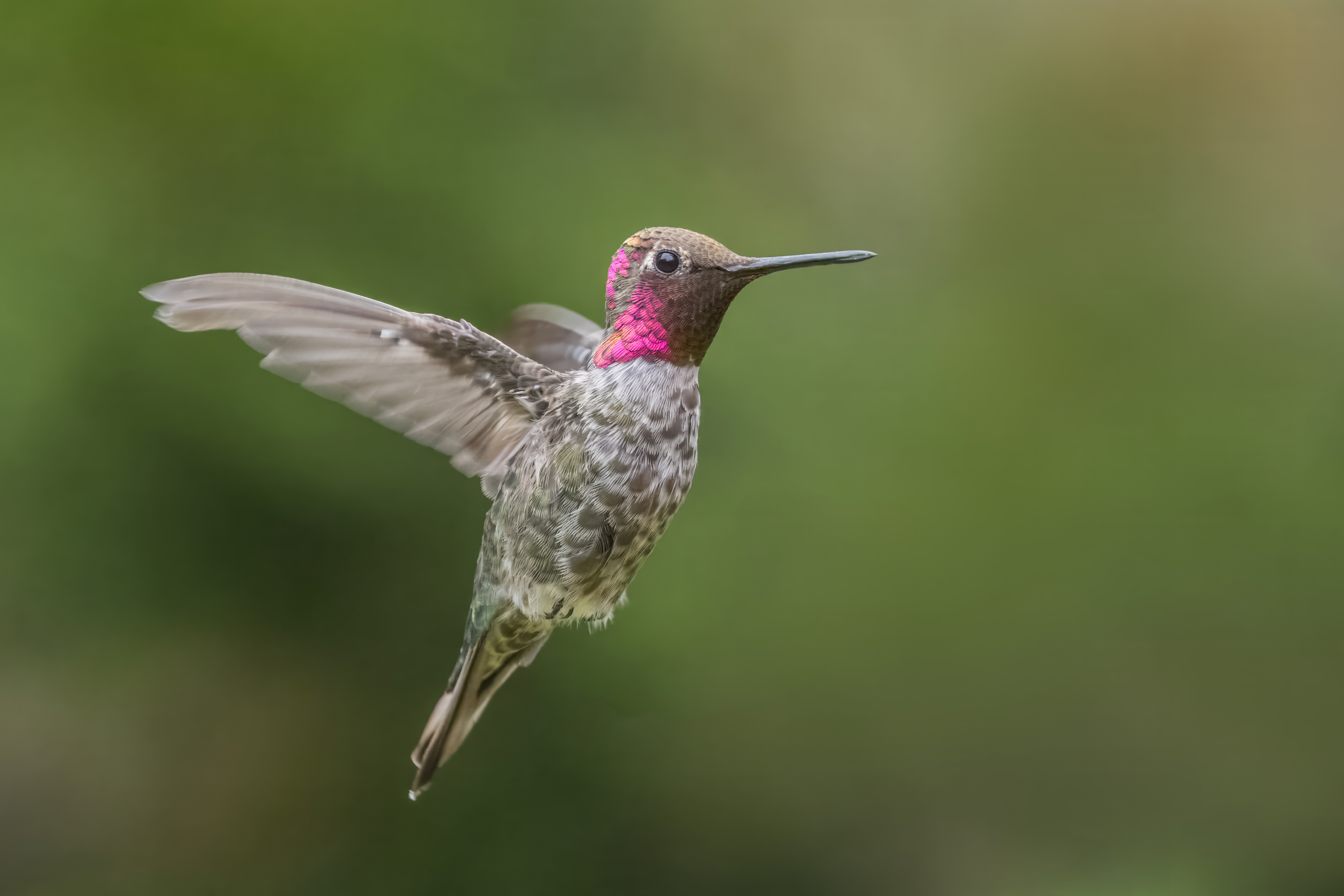
- Male, Vancouver Island
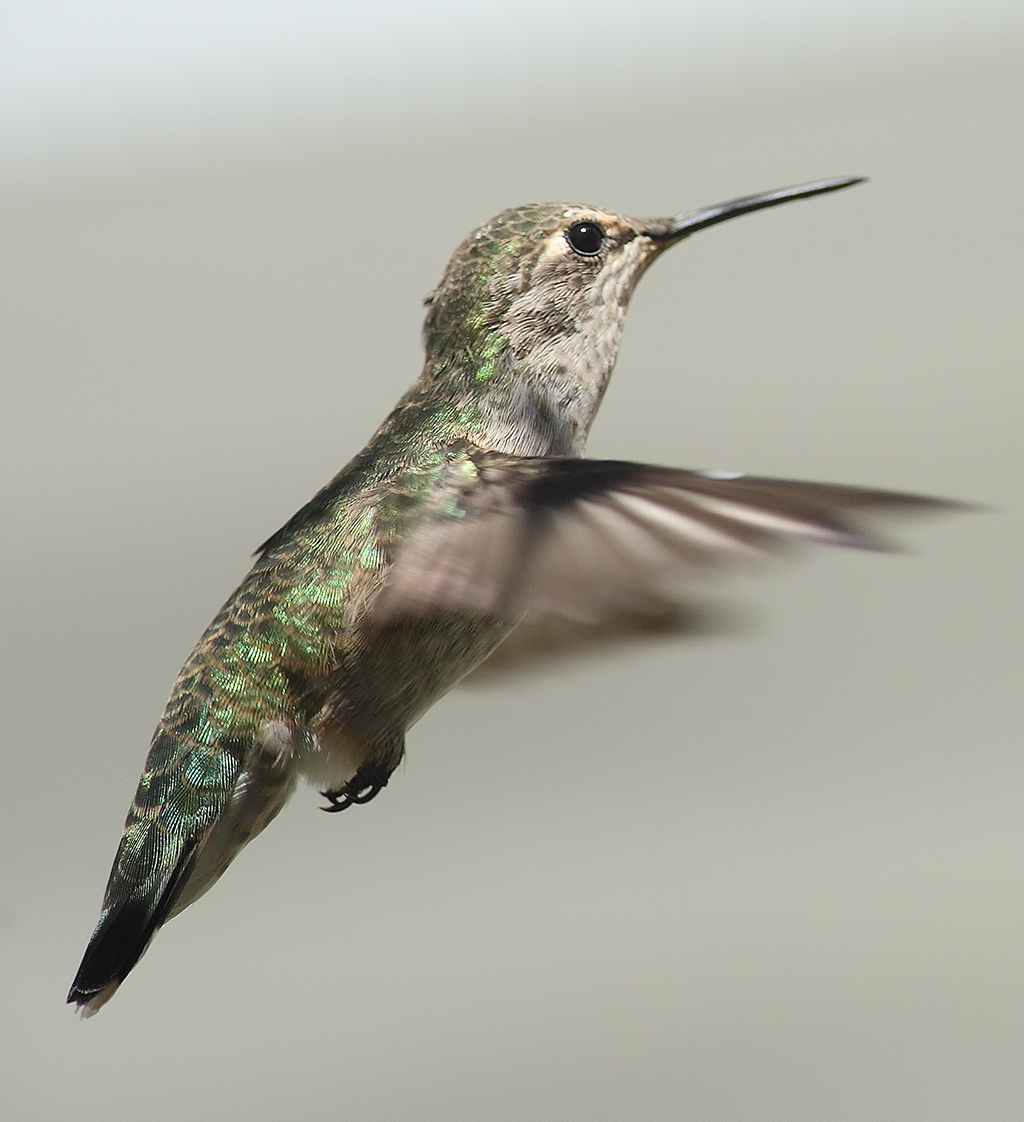
- Female

Conservation status
- Least Concern (IUCN 3.1)

Scientific classification
- Kingdom: Animalia
- Phylum: Chordata
- Class: Aves
- Order: Apodiformes
- Family: Trochilidae
- Genus: Calypte
- Species: C. anna

Binomial name
- Calypte anna (Lesson, 1829)
- Range of C. anna Wintering range Breeding and wintering range

= Anna's hummingbird =

Species of bird

Anna's hummingbird (Calypte anna) is a North American species of hummingbird named after Anna Masséna, Duchess of Rivoli.

It is native to western coastal regions of North America. Until the late 20th century, Anna's hummingbirds migrated from locations as far north as Alaska and coastal British Columbia, returning south to breed in Baja California and Southern California.

Since the 1970s, ornamental plants in residential areas along the Pacific coast and inland deserts provided expanded nectar and nesting sites, allowing the species to expand its breeding range to northern coastal regions without migrating. Year-round residence of Anna's hummingbirds in the Pacific Northwest is an example of ecological release dependent on acclimation to colder winter temperatures, introduced plants, and human provision of nectar feeders during winter.

These birds feed on nectar from flowers using a long extendable tongue. They also consume small insects and other arthropods caught in flight or gleaned from vegetation.

== Taxonomy ==
Anna's hummingbird was formally described and illustrated in 1829 by the French naturalist René Lesson in his Histoire naturelle des Oiseaux-Mouches from a specimen that had been collected in California. Lesson placed it in the genus Ornismya and coined the binomial name Ornismya anna. Anna's hummingbird is now placed in the genus Calypte that was introduced in 1856 by the English ornithologist John Gould. The species is monotypic: no subspecies are recognised.

=== Etymology ===
Gould did not explain the derivation of the genus name but it is probably from the Ancient Greek kaluptrē meaning "woman's veil" or "head-dress" (from kaluptō meaning "to cover"). The specific epithet anna was chosen to honour Anne d'Essling who married the ornithologist François Victor Massena, 3rd Duke of Rivoli.

== Distribution and habitat ==
Anna's hummingbird is found along the western coast of North America, from southern Canada to northern Baja California, and inland to southern and central Arizona, extreme southern Nevada and southeastern Utah, and western Texas. They tend to be permanent residents within their range. However, birds have been spotted far outside their range in such places as southern Alaska, Idaho, Saskatchewan, New York, Florida, Louisiana, and Newfoundland.

In response to rising temperatures at low elevations during climate change in the 21st century, Anna's hummingbirds have expanded their range into the cooler summer environments of higher-altitude (up to 2,825 metres (9,268 ft)) mountainous terrains of California, such as the Sierra Nevada.

Anna's hummingbirds are non-migrating residents of Seattle where they live year-round through winter, enduring extended periods of subfreezing temperatures, snow, and high winds. Anna's hummingbirds have adapted to urban environments and are commonly seen in backyards and parks.

=== Northern range expansion ===
Anna's hummingbirds have the northernmost year-round range of any hummingbird. Birds have been recorded in Alaska as early as 1971, and resident in the Pacific Northwest since the 1960s, particularly increasing as a resident population during the early 21st century. Scientists estimate that some birds overwinter and presumably breed at northern latitudes where food and shelter are available throughout winter, tolerating moderately cold winter temperatures.

During cold temperatures, Anna's hummingbirds gradually gain weight during the day as they convert sugar to fat.

While their range was originally limited to the chaparral of California and Baja California, it expanded northward to Oregon, Washington, and British Columbia, and east to Arizona in the 1960s and 70s. This rapid expansion is attributed to the widespread planting of non-native species, such as eucalyptus, as well as the use of urban bird feeders, in combination with the species' natural tendency for extensive postbreeding dispersal.

In the Pacific Northwest, the fastest growing populations occur in regions with breeding-season cold temperatures similar to those of its native range. Northward expansion of Anna's hummingbird represents an ecological release associated with introduced plants, year-round nectar availability from feeders supplied by humans, milder winter temperatures possibly associated with climate change, and acclimation of the species to a winter climate cooler than its native region. Although quantitative data are absent, it is likely that a sizable percentage of Anna's hummingbirds in the Pacific Northwest still do migrate south for winter, as of 2017.

== Description ==
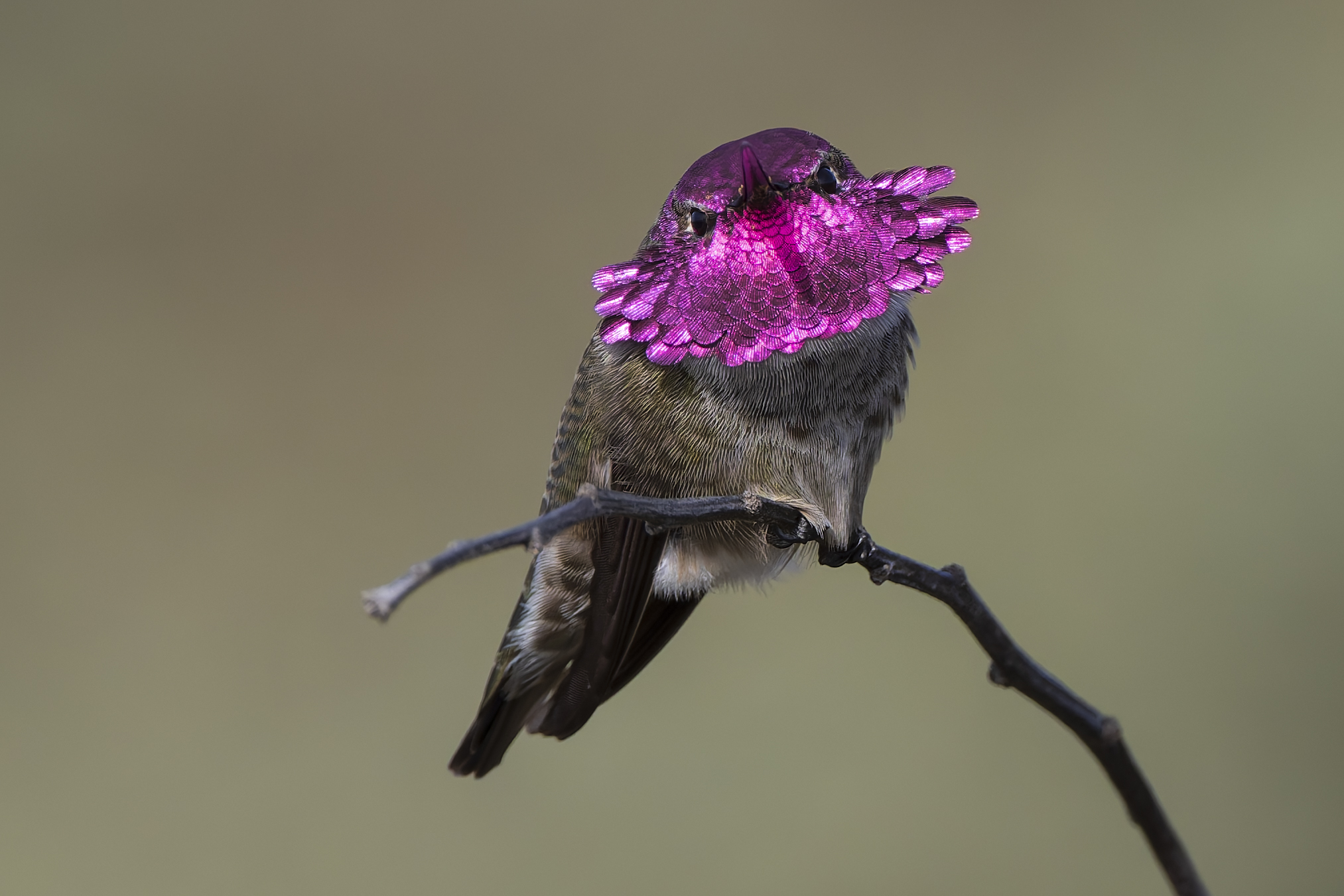
Male displaying iridescent gorget, in California

Anna's hummingbirds are 3.9 to 4.3 in (9.9 to 10.9 cm) long with a wingspan of 4.7 inches (12 cm) and a weight range of 0.1 to 0.2 oz (2.8 to 5.7 g). They have an iridescent bronze-green back, a pale grey chest and belly, and green flanks. Their bills are long, straight, and slender. The adult male has an iridescent crimson-red, derived from magenta, to a reddish-pink crown and gorget, which can look dull brown or gray without direct sunlight, and a dark, slightly forked tail. Females also have iridescent red gorgets, although they are usually smaller and less brilliant than the male.

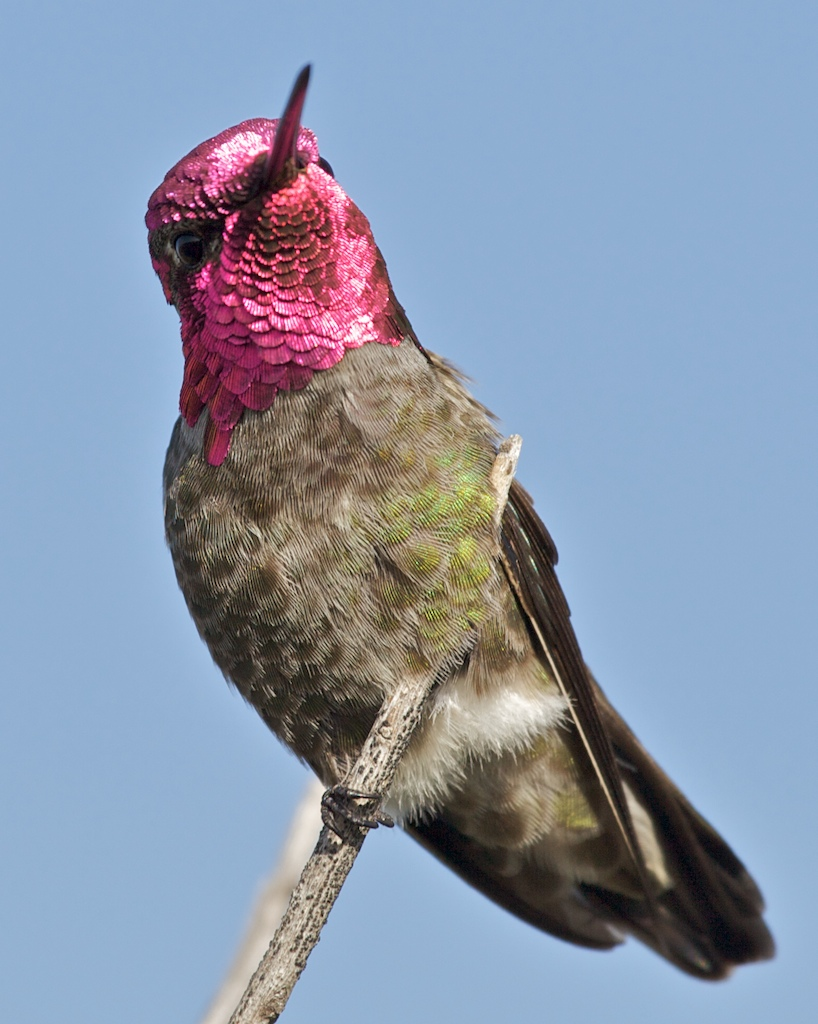
Male

The male Anna's hummingbird is the only North American hummingbird species with a red crown. Females and juvenile males have a dull green crown, a grey throat with or without some red iridescence, a grey chest and belly, and a dark, rounded tail with white tips on the outer feathers.

The male has a striking reddish-pink crown and gorget, which are strongly iridescent and dependent on the angle of illumination and observation by female or male competitor birds. The iridescence results from large stacks of melanosomes in the feather barbules, occurring as layers separated by keratin. The barbules reflect incident light in the manner of partially-opened Venetian blinds, enabling the iridescence – which varies the head and gorget coloration with the changing angle of light – as a coloration advantage for courtship attraction and territory defense.

Male birds with elevated levels of protein in their diet have more colorful crowns and higher iridescence in their head feathers compared with male birds with low protein intake.

== Behavior ==
=== Foraging ===
This species consumes tree sap, nectar from flowers, insects, and sugar-water mixes from feeders. Anna's hummingbirds capture flying insects or eat insects trapped in spider webs, sometimes even the spiders themselves.

=== Pollination ===
Feeding from Salvia, in California

While collecting nectar, Anna's hummingbird assists in plant pollination. There is evidence that Anna's hummingbirds in flight generate an electrostatic charge that adheres pollen to their beaks and feathers, facilitating transfer of pollen grains to hundreds of flowers per day while foraging for nectar.

Anna's hummingbirds can shake their bodies 55 times per second to shed rain while in flight, or in dry weather, to remove pollen or dirt from feathers. Each twist lasts four-hundredths of a second and applies 34 times the force of gravity on the bird's head.

=== Torpor ===
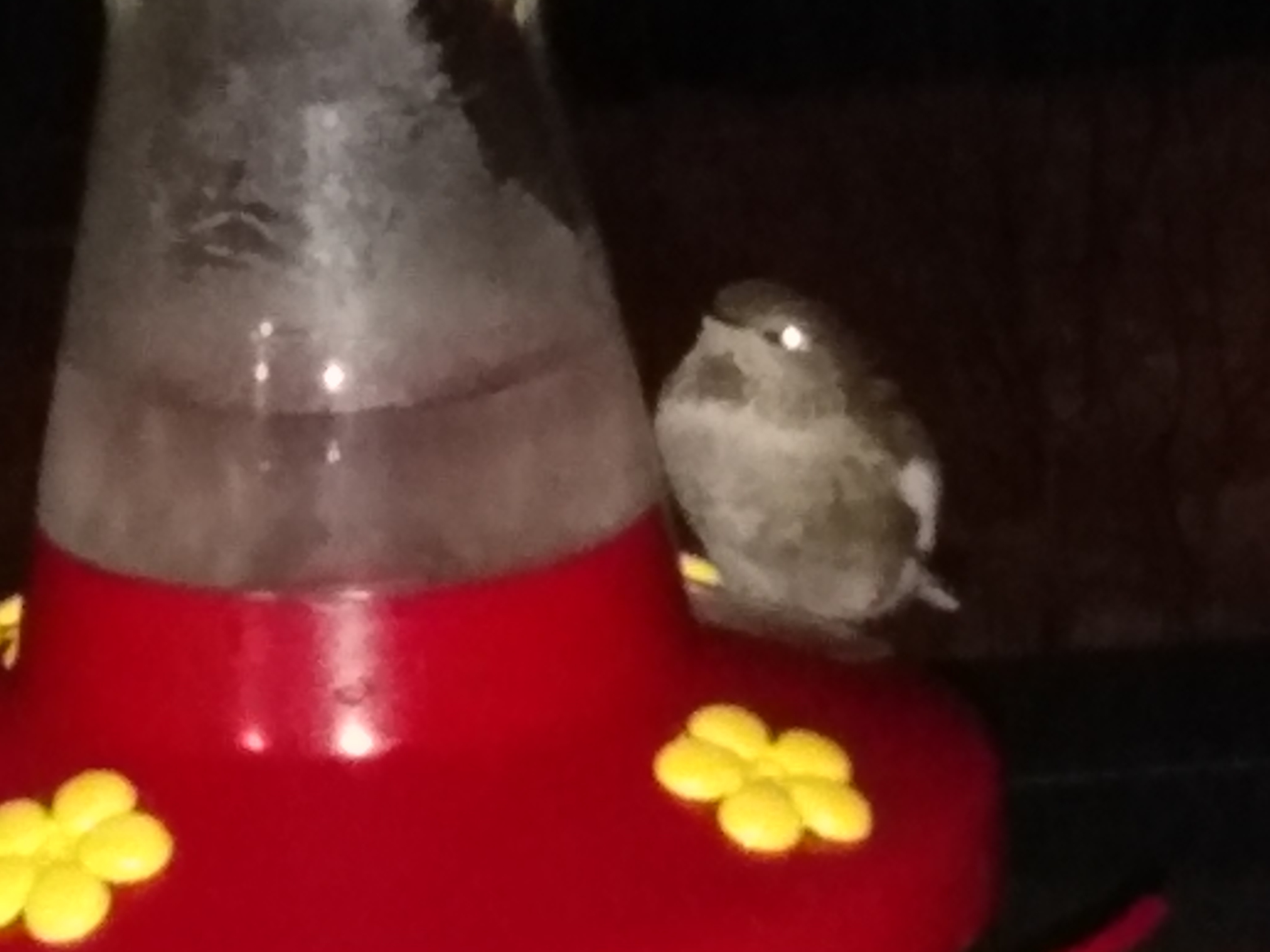
Female in nocturnal torpor during winter; −8 °C (18 °F), near Vancouver, British Columbia. The bird remained in torpor with an unchanged position for more than 12 hours.

Anna's hummingbirds with inadequate stores of body fat or insufficient plumage are able to survive periods of subfreezing weather by lowering their metabolic rate and entering a state of torpor.

When studied in colder temperatures at mountainous elevations, Anna's hummingbirds used torpor more frequently and for longer periods than at lower elevations.

=== Locomotion ===
During hovering flight, Anna's hummingbirds maintain high wingbeat frequencies accomplished by their large pectoral muscles via recruitment of motor units. The pectoral muscles that power hummingbird flight are composed exclusively of fast glycolytic fibers that respond rapidly and are fatigue-resistant.

=== Song and courtship ===
Song of a male Anna's hummingbird

Unlike most northern temperate hummingbirds, the male Anna's hummingbird sings during courtship. The song is thin and squeaky, interspersed with buzzes and chirps, and is drawn to over 10 seconds in duration. During the breeding season, males can be observed performing an aerial display dive over their territories. When a female flies onto a male's territory, the male rises up about 130 ft (40 m) before diving over the female. As the male approaches the bottom of the dive, it reaches an average speed of 27 m/s (89 ft/s), which is 385 body lengths per second. At the bottom of the dive, the male travels 23 m/s (51 mph), and produces an audible sound produced by the tail feathers, described by some as an "explosive squeak". The male's call – scratchy and metallic – is typically used as the bird perches in trees and shrubs.

=== Breeding ===
Open-wooded or shrubby areas and mountain meadows along the Pacific coast from British Columbia to Arizona make up C. anna's breeding habitat. The female raises the young without the assistance of the male. The female bird builds a nest in a shrub or tree, in vines, or attached to wires or other artificial substrates. The round, 3.8-to-5.1-centimetre (1.5 to 2.0 in) diameter nest is constructed of plant fibers, downy feathers and animal hair; the exterior is camouflaged with chips of lichen, plant debris, and occasionally urban detritus such as paint chips and cigarette paper. The nest materials are bound together with spider silk. They are known to nest as early as mid-December and as late as June, depending on geographic location and climatic conditions.

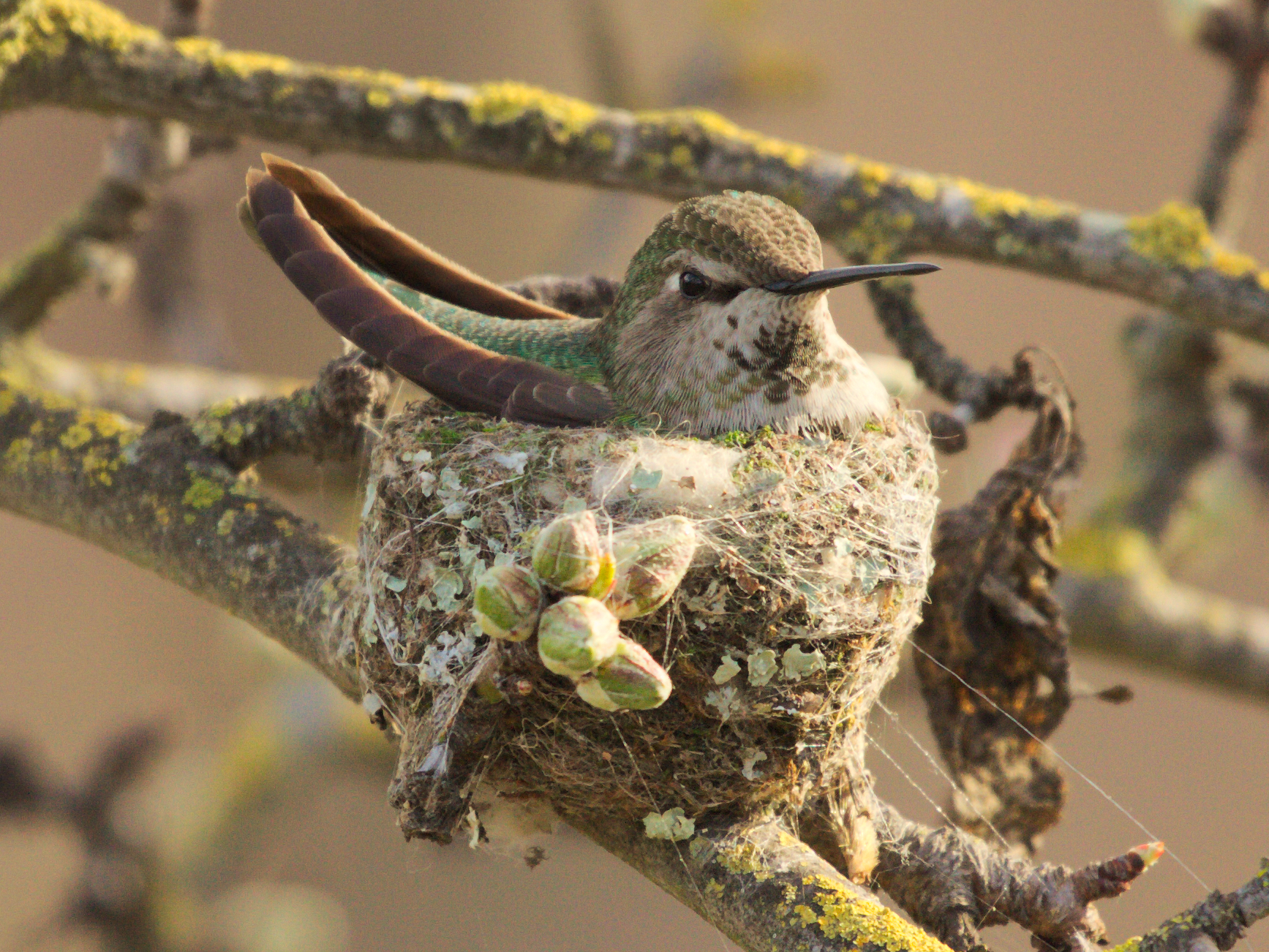
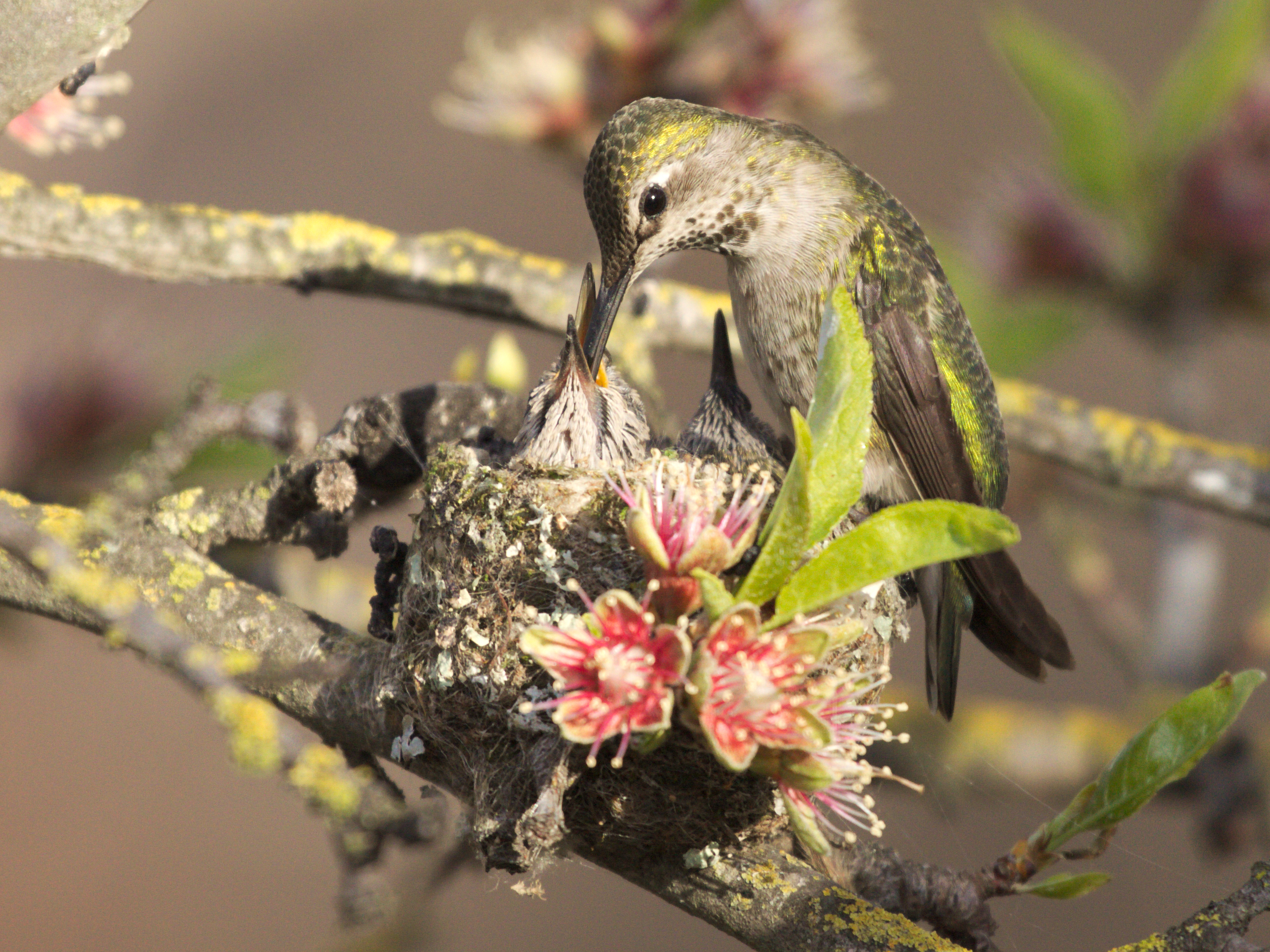
Female incubating eggs (left), and feeding two nestlings 12 days later (right)

==== Hybridization ====
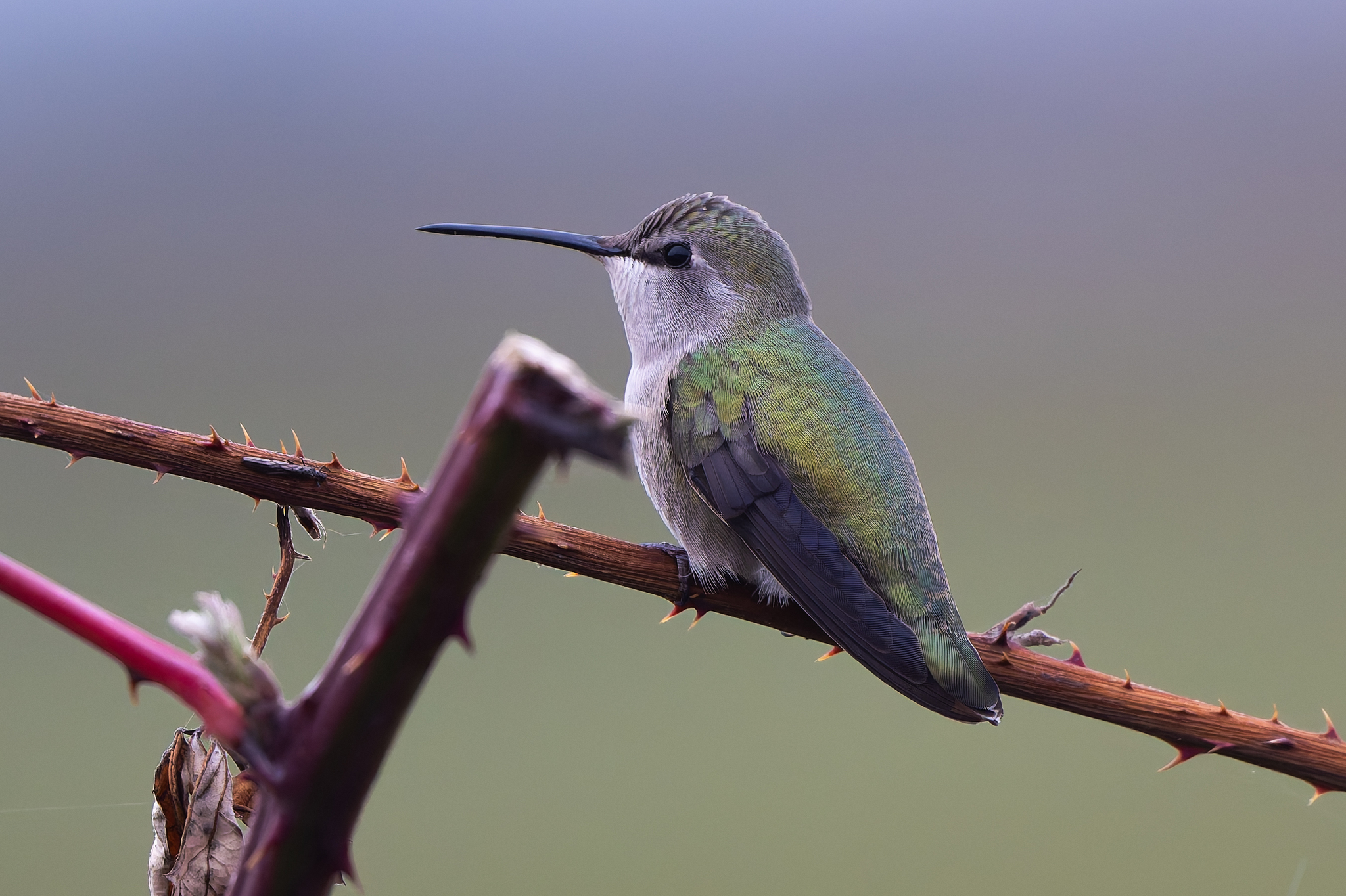
Female hybrid (Calypte anna × costae), in Oregon

Anna's hummingbirds may hybridize with other species, especially the congeneric Costa's hummingbird. These natural hybrids have been mistaken for new species. A bird, allegedly collected in Bolaños, Mexico, was described and named Selasphorus floresii (Gould, 1861), or Floresi's hummingbird. Several more specimens were collected in California over a long period, and the species was considered extremely rare.

The specimens were the hybrid offspring of an Anna's hummingbird and an Allen's hummingbird. A single bird collected in Santa Barbara, California, was described and named Trochilus violajugulum (Jeffries, 1888), or violet-throated hummingbird. It was later determined to be a hybrid between an Anna's hummingbird and a black-chinned hummingbird.

== In culture ==
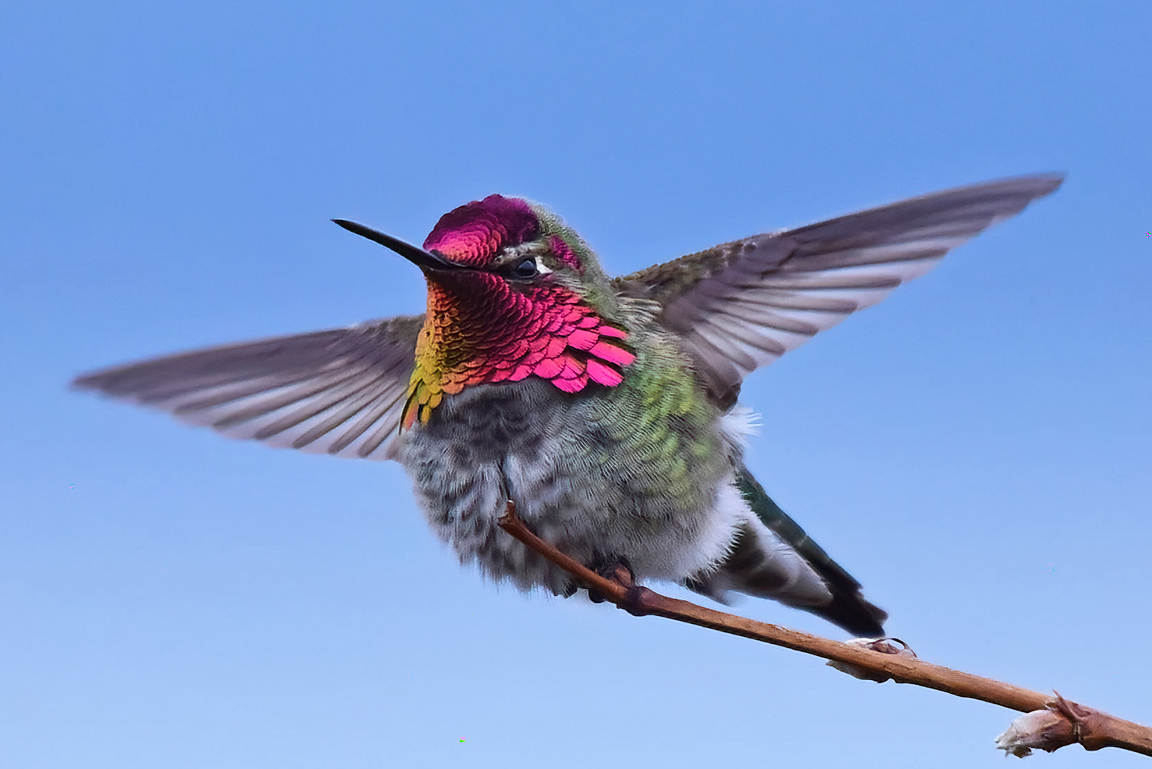
Male in Vancouver

Anna's hummingbird is the official city bird of Vancouver, British Columbia and Sedona, Arizona.

== Conservation ==
According to a 2021 estimate, there are 8 million Anna's hummingbirds in the western United States and Canada, with the population increasing since 1970. The global population is estimated to be 9.6 million mature individuals. As of 2021, the International Union for Conservation of Nature Red List of Threatened Species lists Anna's hummingbird among species of least concern.

== Gallery ==
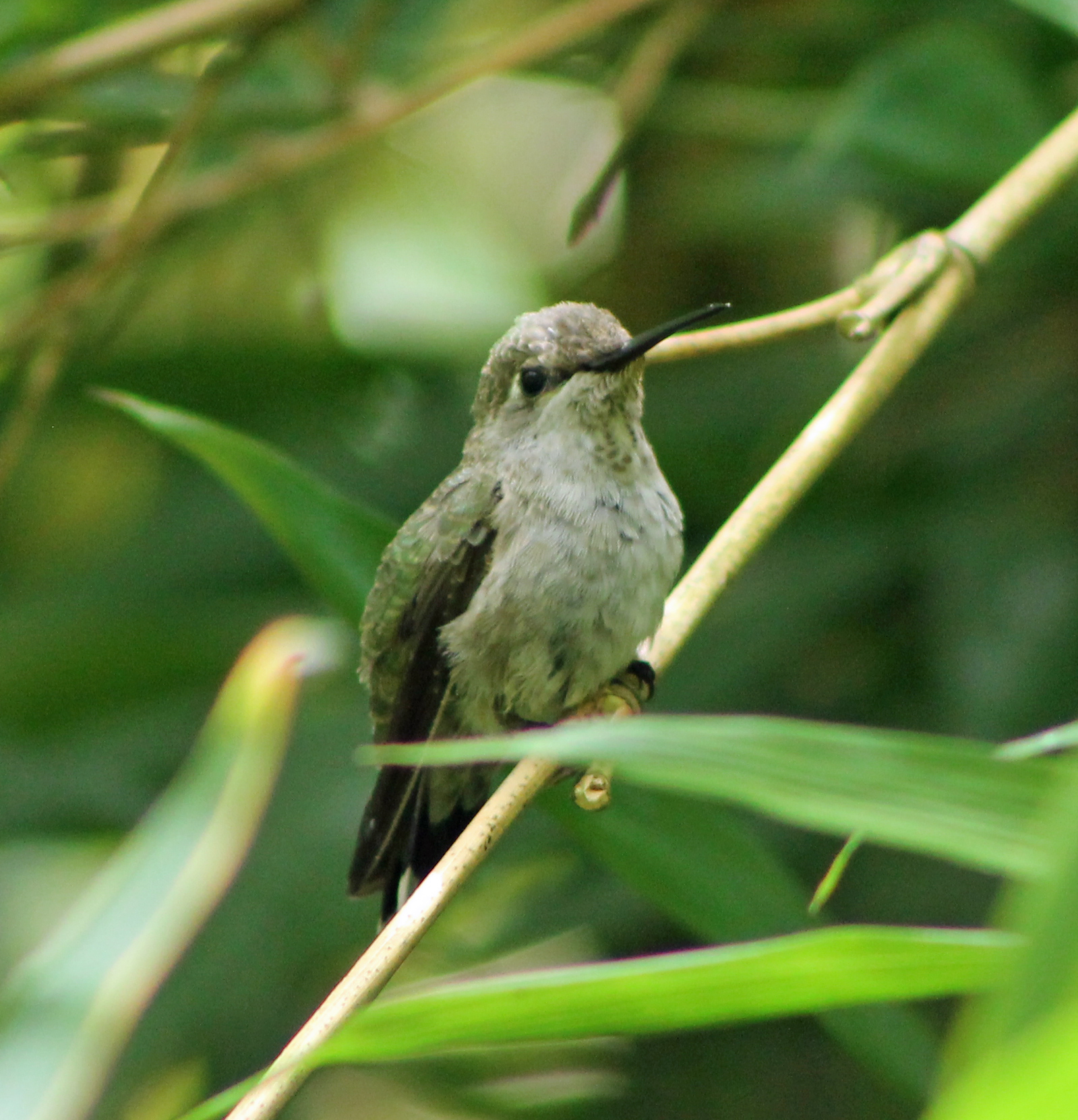
Juvenile, at San Francisco Botanical Garden

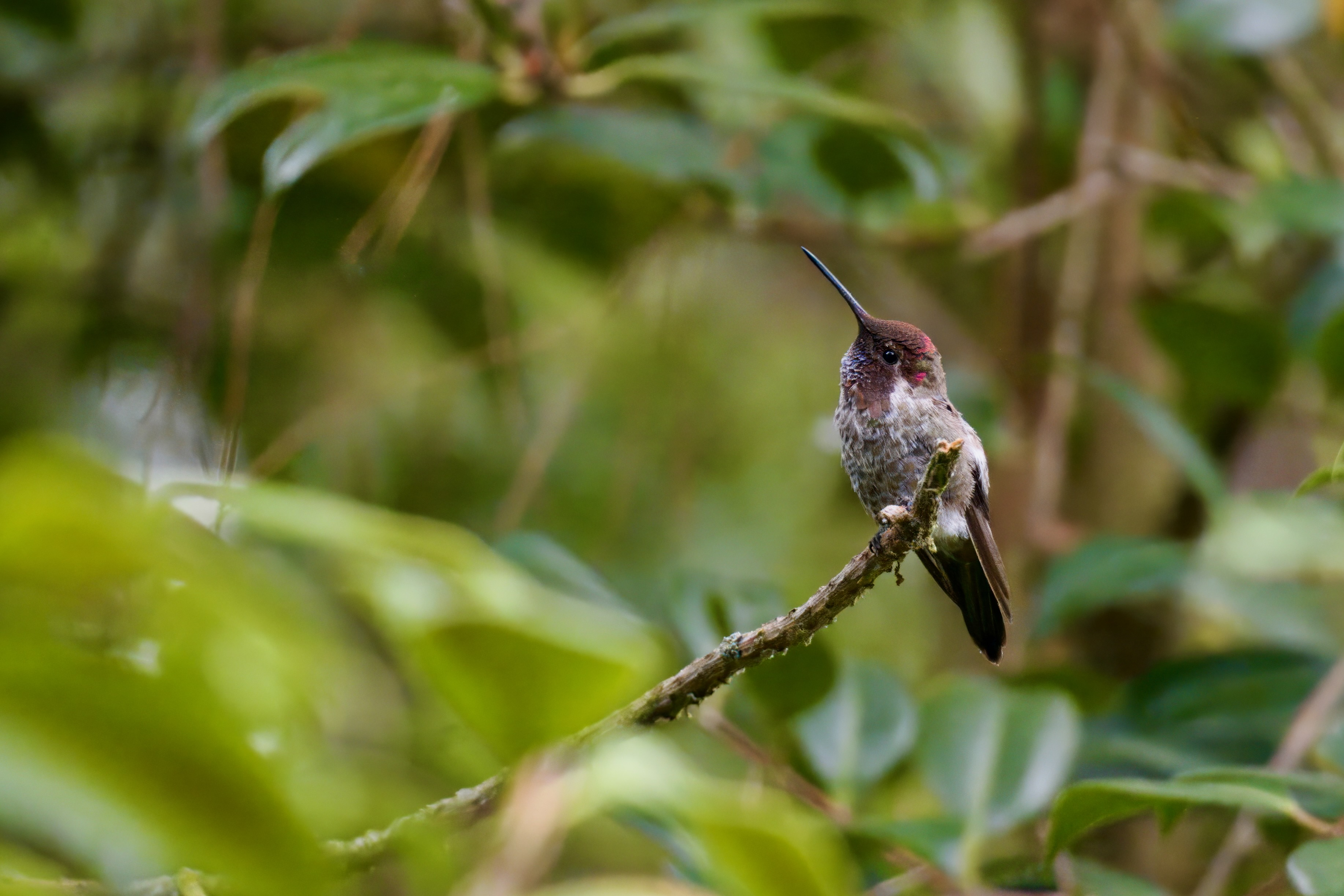
Adult male, at Ballard Locks, Seattle

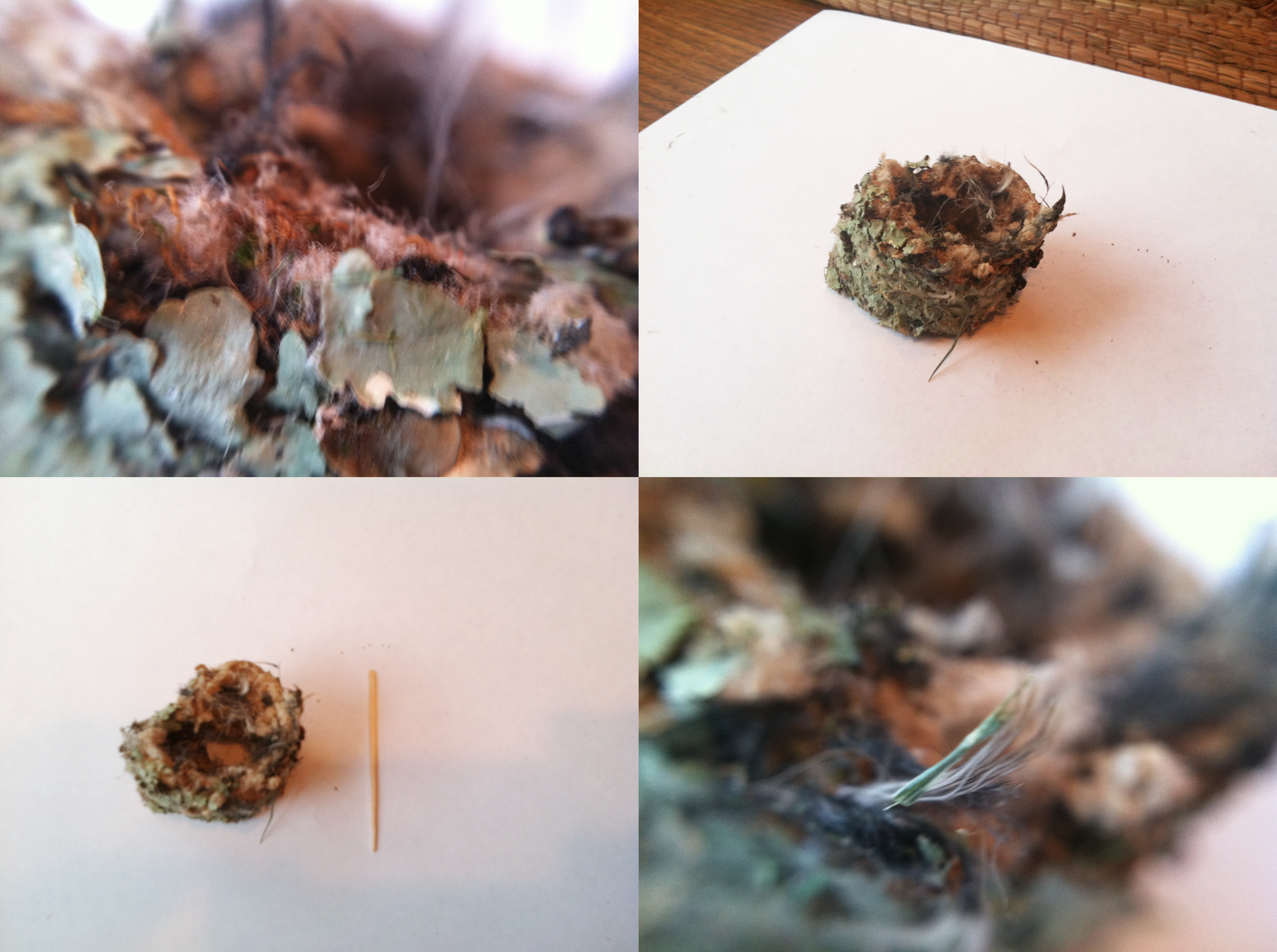
Nest with toothpick for scale, and probably showing juvenile molt plumage

Nestlings defecating. Repeated at one-tenth speed. Nestlings about eight days before fledging.

Female regurgitation feeding its young about eleven days before they fledge. One portion at one-fourth speed
