= La ink =

La ink may refer to:

- LA ink, a design firm in Minneapolis, Minnesota, U.S.
- LA Ink, a reality show on TLC
