= Ecological efficiency =

Efficiency of energy transfer from one trophic level to next

Ecological efficiency is the efficiency with which energy is transferred from one trophic level to the next. It is determined by a combination of efficiencies relating to organismic resource acquisition and assimilation in an ecosystem.

== Energy transfer ==
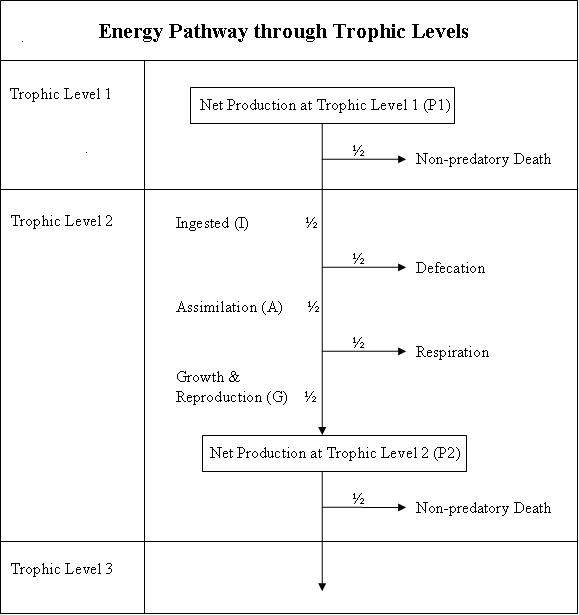
A diagram of energy transfer between trophic levels

Primary production occurs in autotrophic organisms of an ecosystem. Photoautotrophs such as vascular plants and algae convert energy from the sun into energy stored as carbon compounds. Photosynthesis is carried out in the chlorophyll of green plants. The energy converted through photosynthesis is carried through the trophic levels of an ecosystem as organisms consume members of lower trophic levels.

Primary production can be broken down into gross and net primary production. Gross primary production is a measure of the energy that a photoautotroph harvests from the sun. Take, for example, a blade of grass that takes in x joules of energy from the sun. The fraction of that energy that is converted into glucose reflects the gross productivity of the blade of grass. The energy remaining after respiration is considered the net primary production. In general, gross production refers to the energy contained within an organism before respiration and net production the energy after respiration. The terms can be used to describe energy transfer in both autotrophs and heterotrophs.

Energy transfer between trophic levels is generally inefficient, such that net production at one trophic level is generally only 10% of the net production at the preceding trophic level (the Ten percent law). Due to non-predatory death, egestion, and cellular respiration, a significant amount of energy is lost to the environment instead of being absorbed for production by consumers. The figure approximates the fraction of energy available after each stage of energy loss in a typical ecosystem, although these fractions vary greatly from ecosystem to ecosystem and from trophic level to trophic level. The loss of energy by a factor of one half from each of the steps of non-predatory death, defecation, and respiration is typical of many living systems. Thus, the net production at one trophic level is $1/2*1/2*1/2 = 1/8$ or approximately ten percent that of the trophic level before it.

For example, assume 500 units of energy are produced by trophic level 1. One half of that is lost to non-predatory death, while the other half (250 units) is ingested by trophic level 2. One half of the amount ingested is expelled through defecation, leaving the other half (125 units) to be assimilated by the organism. Finally one half of the remaining energy is lost through respiration while the rest (63 units) is used for growth and reproduction. This energy expended for growth and reproduction constitutes to the net production of trophic level 1, which is equal to $500 * 1/2 *1/2 * 1/2 = 63$ units.

== Quantifying ecological efficiency ==
Ecological efficiency is a combination of several related efficiencies that describe resource utilization and the extent to which resources are converted into biomass.

- Exploitation efficiency is the amount of food ingested divided by the amount of prey production ($I_n/P_{n-1}$)
- Assimilation efficiency is the amount of assimilation divided by the amount of food ingestion ($A_n/I_n$)
- Net Production efficiency is the amount of consumer production divided by the amount of assimilation ($P_n/A_n$)
- Gross Production efficiency is the assimilation efficiency multiplied by the net production efficiency, which is equivalent to the amount of consumer production divided by amount of ingestion ($P_n/I_n$)
- Ecological efficiency is the exploitation efficiency multiplied by the assimilation efficiency multiplied by the net production efficiency, which is equivalent to the amount of consumer production divided by the amount of prey production ($P_n/P_{n-1}$)

Theoretically, it is easy to calculate ecological efficiency using the mathematical relationships above. It is often difficult, however, to obtain accurate measurements of the values involved in the calculation. Assessing ingestion, for example, requires knowledge of the gross amount of food consumed in an ecosystem as well as its caloric content. Such a measurement is rarely better than an educated estimate, particularly with relation to ecosystems that are largely inaccessible to ecologists and tools of measurement. The ecological efficiency of an ecosystem is as a result often no better than an approximation. On the other hand, an approximation may be enough for most ecosystems, where it is important not to get an exact measure of efficiency, but rather a general idea of how energy is moving through its trophic levels.

== Applications ==
In agricultural environments, maximizing energy transfer from producer (food) to consumer (livestock) can yield economic benefits. A sub-field of agricultural science has emerged that explores methods of monitoring and improving ecological and related efficiencies.

In comparing the net efficiency of energy utilization by cattle, breeds historically kept for beef production, such as the Hereford, outperformed those kept for dairy production, such as the Holstein, in converting energy from feed into stored energy as tissue. This is a result of the beef cattle storing more body fat than the dairy cattle, as energy storage as protein was at the same level for both breeds. This implies that cultivation of cattle for slaughter is a more efficient use of feed than is cultivation for milk production.

While it is possible to improve the efficiency of energy use by livestock, it is vital to the world food question to also consider the differences between animal husbandry and plant agriculture. Caloric concentration in fat tissues are higher than in plant tissues, causing high-fat organisms to be most energetically concentrated; however, the energy required to cultivate feed for livestock is only partially converted into fat cells. The rest of the energy input into cultivating feed is respired or egested by the livestock and unable to be used by humans.

Out of a total of 28,400 terawatt-hours (96.8×10^{15} BTU) of energy used in the US in 1999, 10.5% was used in food production, with the percentage accounting for food from both producer and primary consumer trophic levels. In comparing the cultivation of animals versus plants, there is a clear difference in magnitude of energy efficiency. Edible kilocalories produced from kilocalories of energy required for cultivation are: 18.1% for chicken, 6.7% for grass-fed beef, 5.7% for farmed salmon, and 0.9% for shrimp. In contrast, potatoes yield 123%, corn produce 250%, and soy results in 415% of input calories converted to calories able to be utilized by humans. This disparity in efficiency reflects the reduction in production from moving up trophic levels. Thus, it is more energetically efficient to form a diet from lower trophic levels.

== Ten percent law ==
The ten percent law of transfer of energy from one trophic level to the next can be attributed to Raymond Lindeman (1942), although Lindeman did not call it a "law" and cited ecological efficiencies ranging from 0.1% to 37.5%. According to this law, during the transfer of organic food energy from one trophic level to the next higher level, only about ten percent of the transferred energy is stored as flesh. The remaining is lost during transfer, broken down in respiration, or lost to incomplete digestion by higher trophic level.

=== 10% law ===
When organisms are consumed, approximately 10% of the energy in the food is fixed into their flesh and is available for next trophic level (carnivores or omnivores). When a carnivore or an omnivore in turn consumes that animal, only about 10% of energy is fixed in its flesh for the higher level.

For example, the sun releases 10,000 J of energy, then plants take only 100 J of energy from sunlight (exception- Only 1% of energy is taken up by plants from sun); thereafter, a deer would take 10 J (10% of energy) from the plant. A wolf eating the deer would only take 1 J (10% of energy from deer). A human eating the wolf would take 0.1J (10% of energy from wolf), etc.

The ten percent law provides a basic understanding on the cycling of food chains. Furthermore, the ten percent law shows the inefficiency of energy capture at each successive trophic level. The rational conclusion is that energy efficiency is best preserved by sourcing food as close to the initial energy source as possible.

=== Formula ===
$Energy\ at\ n(th)\ level = \frac{energy\ given\ by\ sun}{10^{n+1}}$

== Ecological efficiency in the marine environment ==
Marine environments exhibit some differences from terrestrial environments, and transfer efficiencies between marine trophic levels are generally higher. Compared to the 10% transfer efficiency in the terrestrial environment suggested by the "ten percent law", the transfer efficiency between marine primary producers (phytoplankton) and primary consumers (herbivorous zooplankton) is estimated to be at about 20%. Marine phytoplankton are higher in protein and contain less indigestible cellulose compared to terrestrial plants, leaving more biomass available to be incorporated into the next trophic level. In fact, less than 15% of terrestrial plant production is consumed by herbivores, leaving much of it to enter the microbial decomposition cycle.

Another useful metric to introduce is the production to biomass ratio (P/B), which describes the turnover of plant material per year. In marine environments, phytoplankton grow quickly and are almost immediately grazed; this is evidenced by the fact that phytoplankton biomass can turn over 100–300 times per year. Terrestrial plants, on the other hand, grow slowly and expend much of the energy derived from primary production on their own respiration, resulting in much smaller P/B ratios of between 0.5 and 2.0.

Secondary production at sea tends to be more efficient as well, with up to a 15% transfer efficiency between trophic levels. Some of this difference can be explained by the lower energy requirements marine organisms have compared to their terrestrial counterparts. Most marine animals are cold blooded and expend little energy on temperature regulation. Furthermore, locomotion is more efficient in the marine environment; marine organisms reap the benefits of living in a buoyant liquid, spend much less effort countering gravity, and can drift and swim, instead of walk or fly. Marine animals also reproduce en masse and expend little energy caring for their young.

Additionally, knowledge of the number of trophic levels in a given marine food chain can be used to predict the size and biomass of top-level predators. Primary producers in the nutrient poor, open ocean areas are usually very small in size, and top-level predators are incapable of feeding directly on them. This requires more intermediary organisms of increasing size to convert those small organisms into prey large enough to be consumed. On the other hand, coastal and nutrient rich areas typically have large, chain-forming diatoms as the predominant primary producers, and fish and zooplankton are sometimes capable of feeding directly on them. This reduces the length of the food chain and the corresponding trophic energy losses. Costal upwelling zones may have a little as three trophic levels and sustain top-level organisms as large as whales. Conversely, open ocean areas can have as many as six trophic levels and sustain small tuna and squid at the top of the food web.

== See also ==
- Eco-efficiency – the economic efficiency with which human society uses ecological resources
