= Wall of Discovery =

Environmental artwork

The Wall of Discovery is an environmental artwork that includes a 253-foot-long printed "blackboard" located in the center of the Scholars Walk on the University of Minnesota campus. This installation was designed to celebrate the discoveries, inventions and creations of alumni and faculty of the University that have brought significant changes to the world in which we live.

The method used to capture the work was first to create an extensive list of notable U of M graduates in as many fields as possible. Extensive research was done by Minneapolis design firm LA ink that led to the finding of many original hand written notes and diagrams chronicling the discoveries by these scholars. The documents were then scanned and retouched, pixel by pixel, until they looked as if they were rendered in chalk on a chalkboard. 20 Glass edge lit panels were also designed to both illuminate the walkway and possibly inspire current students toward future discoveries.

An installation of this nature has never before been attempted by a major institution like the University of Minnesota.

The Artwork was submitted to the SEGD design competition in 2007 and won their "Honor Award" the highest achievement category. That same year it also received the AIA Minnesota Honor Award.

== Persons represented on the wall ==
Over 100 alumni and faculty from the University of Minnesota are represented on the wall a few of whom are:

- Robert W. Gore
- Seymour Cray
- Ancel Keys
- Norman Borlaug
- John Berryman
- Earl Bakken
- Reynold Johnson
- F. John Lewis (cardiac surgeon)
- Hubert Humphrey
- Roy Wilkins
- Herb Brooks
- Garrison Keillor
- Deke Slayton
- Warren Burger
- Harry Blackmun
- James ‘Crash’ Ryan 2
- Saul Bellow
- Bob Dylan
- Raymond Lindeman
