= Raymond Lindeman =

American ecologist

Raymond Laurel Lindeman
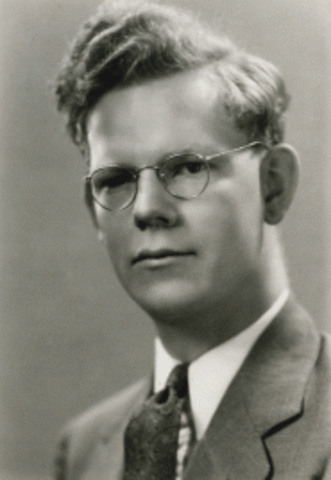
- Born: July 24, 1915; Redwood County, Minnesota
- Died: June 29, 1942 (aged 26); New Haven, Connecticut
- Education: University of Minnesota
- Known for: Pioneering the concept of trophic dynamics in ecology
- Scientific career
- Fields: Limnology, paleolimnology, trophic ecology
- Workplaces: Yale University
- Doctoral advisor: Samuel Eddy

Raymond Laurel Lindeman (July 24, 1915 – June 29, 1942) was an ecologist whose graduate research is credited with being a seminal study in the field of ecosystem ecology, specifically on the topic of trophic dynamics.

== Graduate research work ==
Lindeman completed his PhD at the University of Minnesota with his thesis work being concerned with the history and ecological dynamics of Cedar Bog Lake, which is located in the University of Minnesota's Cedar Creek Ecosystem Science Reserve in central Minnesota.

While a postdoctoral researcher at Yale University with noted limnologist G. Evelyn Hutchinson, Lindeman submitted a chapter of his thesis for publication. His manuscript was initially rejected as being too generalized but was published after Hutchinson and others were able to convince the editor of the paper's merits. The publication appeared in the journal Ecology and establishes the ten percent law whereby only 10% of the energy consumed at one trophic level is transferred to higher trophic levels. Having suffered from chronic gastro-intestinal and liver inflammation, Lindeman died in 1942 at the age of 26, probably from hepatitis.

== Legacy ==
An annual award in Lindeman's honor is given by the Association for the Sciences of Limnology and Oceanography to the outstanding paper written that year by a young aquatic scientist. Lindeman is also honored today with a lecture series in his name in the Department of Ecology, Evolution and Behavior, University of Minnesota, as well as an informative plaque on the same university's Wall of Discovery.

== Publications ==
- Lindeman, RL (1939). Some affinities and varieties of the planktonic rotifer Brachnionus havanaensis Rouss. Transactions of the American Microscopical Society 58: 210–221.
- Lindeman, RL (1941). "The developmental history of Cedar Creek Bog, Minnesota". American Midland Naturalist. 25 (1): 101–112.
- Lindeman, RL (1941). "Seasonal food-cycle dynamics in a Senescent Lake". American Midland Naturalist. 26 (3): 636–673.
- Lindeman, RL (1942). "Experimental simulation of winter anaerobiosis in a senescent lake". Ecology. 23 (1): 1–13.
- Lindeman, RL (1942). "Seasonal distribution of midge larvae in a scenescent lake". American Midland Naturalist. 27 (2): 428–444.
- Lindeman, RL (1942). "The trophic-dynamic aspect of ecology". Ecology. 23 (4): 399–418.

== Biographies ==
- Reif, CB (1986). "Memories of Raymond Laurel Lindeman". Bulletin of the Ecological Society of America. 67 (1): 20–25
- Sobczak, WV (2005). "Lindeman's trophic dynamic aspect of ecology: "Will you still need me when I'm 64?". Limnology and Oceanography Bulletin. 14 (3): 53–57
- Sterner RW (2012) Raymond Laurel Lindeman and the Trophic Dynamic Viewpoint. Limnology and Oceanography Bulletin 21(2):38-51.
