= LA ink =

Design firm based in Minneapolis, Minnesota, USA

LA ink is a design firm established in 1987 and based in Minneapolis, MN. Most notable for their pioneering work in large scale printed murals and achievement recognition installations. Some key examples of their work are the SEGD 2007 Honor Award / AIA MN Award winning "Wall of Discovery" and the Northwest Airlines hangar mural at the Minneapolis-Saint Paul International Airport. At the time, the largest printed graphic in North America at 11,000 sq ft (1,000 m^{2}). until the hangar was torn down in 2004 for airport expansion.

In 2008 LA ink completed work on thirteen large scale mosaic murals totaling over 3200' sq and fifty 4' x 10' hanging mobiles that decorate Macalester College's Leonard Center. Also in 2008 the firm's work on the Wall of Discovery was used as a case study in Jennifer and Ken Visocky O'Grady's "Information Design Handbook"
