= Ecological release =

Ecological release refers to a population increase or niche expansion that occurs when a species is freed from limiting factors in its environment. These limiting factors can include predation, competitors, herbivory, and parasitism. Ecological release can occur when a population colonizes a new area and is introduced to a new environment. It may also occur when predators, keystone species, diseases, and competition are eliminated from a species habitats. Ecological release can also be caused by human activity, which can result in the removal of certain species or the growth of invasive species.

== Origin ==
The origins of ecological release come from the ideas of scientist, David Lack. He believed that interspecific competition impacted population densities of island birds. One of the first studies that linked niche shifts to the presence and absence of competitors was by Lack and Southern where habitat broadness of song birds was positively correlated to the absence of a related species. However, the actual term ecological release was first used by Edward Wilson. He studied Melanesian ant populations and found that their behaviors were influenced by interspecific competition limiting the available resources. He originally believed that both niche expansion and density compensation help to reduce interspecific competition. However, later in his career he concluded that although niche expansion is connected to density competition, it is its own concept. In later years, scientists began to describe ecological release as a form of niche expansion that occurs when a limiting factor is removed from a populations environment.

== Common example ==
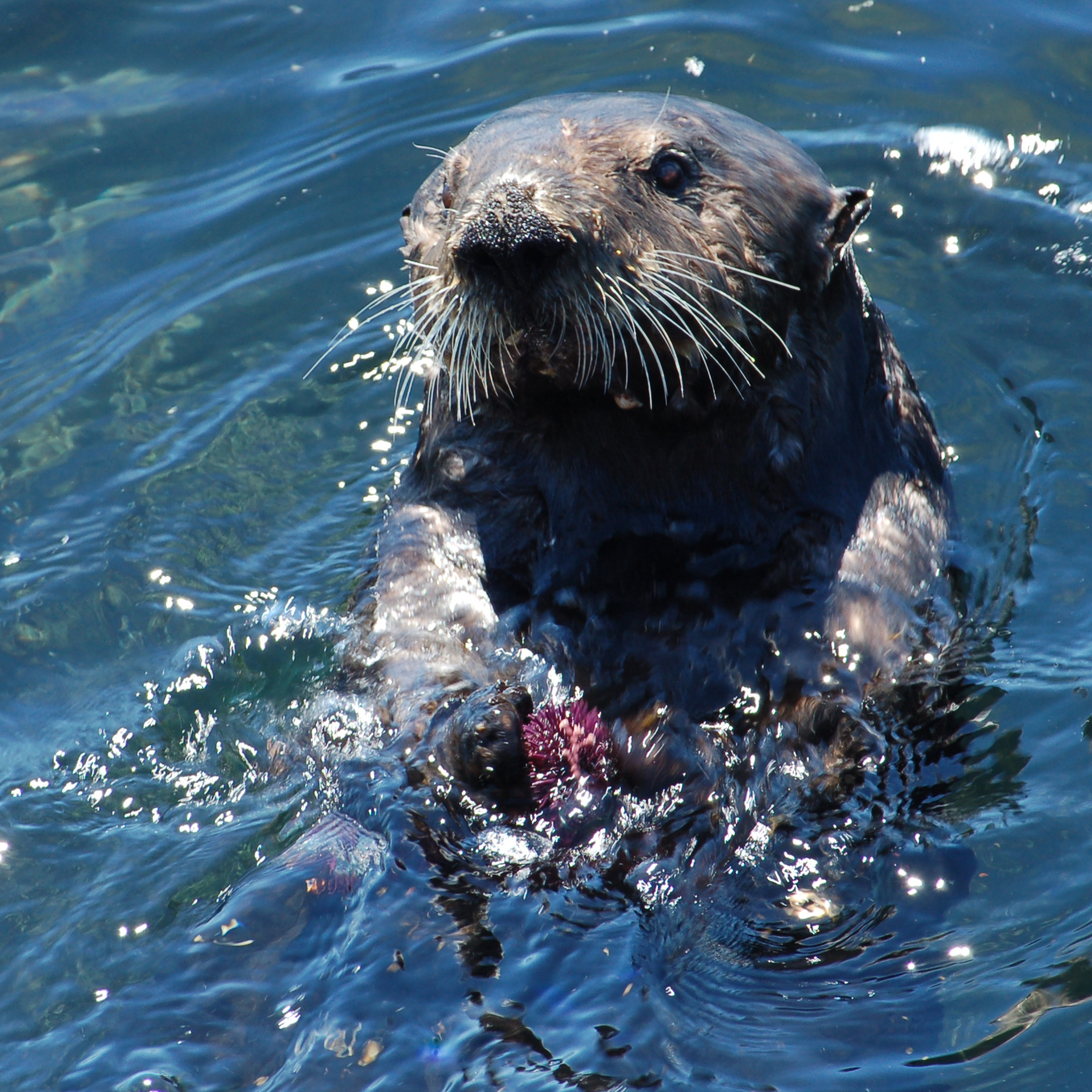
Sea otter, an example of keystone species, holding a sea urchin.

When a disease, competitor, keystone species, or top predator is removed from a community or ecosystem, ecological release may occur. An example of this latter dynamic includes the population explosions of sea urchins in Southwest Alaska with the decrease in sea otter populations. Sea otters are a keystone species and consume sea urchins, preventing sea urchins from overeating kelp. When sea otters are removed from ecosystems, this removal results in the extreme population growth of sea urchins.

When competition is eliminated, populations can grow larger and at a faster rate. An example of this includes Wilson's study on Melanesian ants. In areas with less competition Melanesian ant populations grew much larger than those who had to fight many competitors for resources.

Ecological release may also occur when species are introduced to new environments. When this occurs, species may find themselves suddenly freed from previous limiting factors. This allows their population numbers to increase beyond their previous limitations. The foreign species can either flourish into a local population or die out. Most released species that don't immediately die out tend to find a small niche in the local ecosystem. However, some species populations may increase significantly and potentially become invasive.

== Causes and mechanisms ==
=== Cascade effect ===
When a keystone species, such as a top predator, is removed from a community or ecosystem, an ecological cascade effect can occur. When this occurs, a series of secondary extinctions can take place. Keystone predators are responsible for the control of prey densities, and their removal can result in an increase in one or a number of predators, consumers, or competitors elsewhere in the food web. Several prey or competitor species can consequently suffer a population decline and potentially be extirpated; the result of this would be a decrease in community diversity.

An example of this cascade effect is the overconsumption of kelp by sea urchins when sea otter populations decrease. Without the keystone species, prey populations can grow indefinitely, and will ultimately be limited by resources such as food and shelter. Due to these secondary extinctions, a niche is left unfilled: this allows a new species to invade and exploit the resources that are no longer being used by other species.

== Human-caused ecological release ==
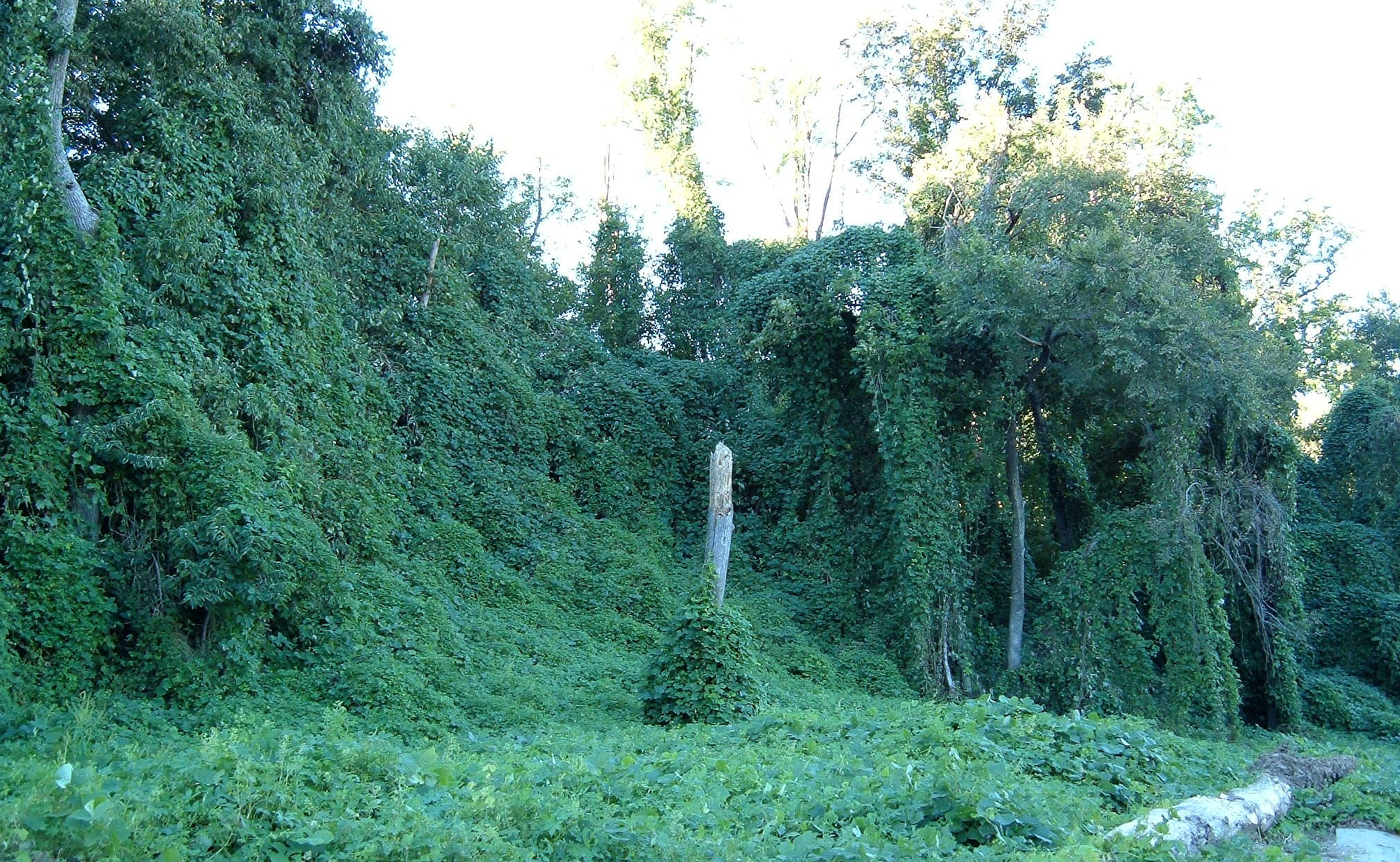
Kudzu, an example of human-caused ecological release.

Human-caused ecological release refers to the intentional or unintentional anthropogenic change that may lead to ecological release. Human caused impacts including overhunting, human made changes to certain environments, and climate change can all potentially lead to ecological release.

Invasive species are an example of human caused ecological release. When these species are released to new environments, their populations can grow due to the lack of predators from their native environment. This can be a result of low levels of biodiversity, an abundance of resources, and particular traits allow their numbers to increase dramatically. Human caused ecological release and the specific impact of invasive species on it is still being investigated.

An example of invasive human caused ecological release is kudzu in the Southeast United States. Kudzu was introduced to certain regions of the United States to prevent soil erosion. However, kudzu is an invasive species and can cause many negative impacts on native species.

== See also ==
- Mesopredator release hypothesis
- Trophic cascade
- Fishing down the food web
- Interspecific competition
- Biodiversity
- Keystone species
