= Cascade effect (ecology) =

Series of secondary extinctions

In ecology, a cascade effect is a series of secondary extinctions that are triggered by the primary extinction of a key species in an ecosystem. Secondary extinctions are likely to occur when the threatened species are: dependent on a few specific food sources, mutualistic (dependent on the key species in some way), or forced to coexist with an invasive species that is introduced to the ecosystem. Species introductions to a foreign ecosystem can often devastate entire communities, and even entire ecosystems. These exotic species monopolize the ecosystem's resources, and since they have no natural predators to decrease their growth, they are able to increase indefinitely.

Olsen et al. showed that exotic species have caused lake and estuary ecosystems to go through cascade effects due to loss of algae, crayfish, mollusks, fish, amphibians, and birds. However, the principal cause of cascade effects is the loss of top predators as the key species. As a result of this loss, a dramatic increase (ecological release) of prey species occurs. The prey is then able to overexploit its own food resources, until the population numbers decrease in abundance, which can lead to extinction. When the prey's food resources disappear, they starve and may go extinct as well. If the prey species is herbivorous, then their initial release and exploitation of the plants may result in a loss of plant biodiversity in the area.

If other organisms in the ecosystem also depend upon these plants as food resources, then these species may go extinct as well. An example of the cascade effect caused by the loss of a top predator is apparent in tropical forests. When hunters cause local extinctions of top predators, the predators' prey's population numbers increase, causing an overexploitation of a food resource and a cascade effect of species loss. Recent studies have been performed on approaches to mitigate extinction cascades in food-web networks.

== Current example ==
One example of the cascade effect caused by the loss of a top predator has to do with sea otters (Enhydra lutris). Starting before the 17th century and not phased out until 1911 when an international treaty was signed to prevent their further exploitation, sea otters were hunted aggressively for their pelts, which caused a cascade effect through the kelp forest ecosystems along the Pacific Coast of North America.

One of the sea otters' primary food sources is the sea urchin (Class: Echinoidea). When hunters caused sea otter populations to decline, an ecological release of sea urchin populations occurred. The sea urchins then overexploited their main food source, kelp, creating urchin barrens where no life exists. No longer having food to eat, the sea urchins populations became locally extinct as well. Also, since kelp forest ecosystems are homes to many other species, the loss of the kelp ultimately caused their extinction as well. In conclusion, the loss of sea otters in local areas along the Pacific coast seems to have caused a cascade effect of secondary extinctions, continuing into the present day.

== See also ==
- Competition (biology)
- Critical transition
- Defaunation
- Ecological release
- Generalist and specialist species
- Greenpeace
- IUCN
- Mutualism
- Overexploitation
- Trophic cascade
- World Wide Fund for Nature
