= Plant strategies =

Survival and reproduction mechanisms used by plants

Plant strategies include mechanisms and responses plants use to reproduce, defend, survive, and compete on the landscape. The term “plant strategy” has existed in the literature since at least 1965, however multiple definitions exist. Strategies have been classified as adaptive strategies (through a change in the genotype), reproductive strategies, resource allocation strategies, ecological strategies, and functional trait based strategies, to name a few. While numerous strategies exist, one underlying theme is constant: plants must make trade-offs when responding to their environment. These trade-offs and responses lay the groundwork for classifying the strategies that emerge.

== Background ==
The concept of plant strategies started gaining attention in the 1960s and 1970s. At this time, strategies were often associated with genotypic changes, such that plants could respond to their environment by changing their “genotypic programme” (i.e., strategy). Around this same time, the r/K selection theory was introduced, which classifies plants by life history strategies, particularly reproductive strategies. In general, plants alter their reproductive strategies (i.e., number of offspring) and their growth rate to respond to their ecological niche. The theory is still popular in the 21st century and frequently taught in science curricula. However, plant strategies really gained notoriety in 1977 with the introduction of Grime’s C-S-R Triangle, which categorizes plants according to how they respond under varying levels of stress and competition. According to Grime, plants develop strategies that demonstrate resource trade-offs between growth, reproduction, and maintenance. The association between genotypic change and strategies was also still present in Grime’s theories, as he noted that the “genotypes of the majority of plants appear to represent compromises between the conflicting selection pressures” that generally classify plants into three strategy types. The C-S-R Triangle remained the dominant plant strategy for several decades. However, in the early 1980s David Tilman introduced the R* theory, which focused on resource partitioning as strategies to deal with competition. More recently, additional strategies have been introduced. In 1998, the L-H-S strategy scheme was introduced as an alternative to Grime's C-S-R scheme. The L-H-S strategy focuses on leaf and seed mass traits to classify plant strategies, noting that these traits can be measured and compared between species, which cannot easily be done with Grime's abstract categories. The goal of the L-H-S scheme was to develop an international network that could provide quantifiable comparisons between plant strategies. This started a movement towards incorporating functional traits in plant strategies, and understanding how plant functional traits and environmental factors are related. While Grime's C-S-R Triangle is still frequently referenced in plant ecology, new strategies are being introduced and gaining momentum in the 21st century.

== Grime's C-S-R Triangle / Universal Adaptive Strategy Theory (UAST) ==
J. P. Grime identified two factor gradients, broadly categorized as disturbance and stress, which limit plant biomass. Stresses include factors such as the availability of water, nutrients, and light, along with growth-inhibiting influences like temperature and toxins. Conversely, disturbance encompasses herbivory, pathogens, anthropogenic interactions, fire, wind, etc. Emerging from high and low combinations of stress and disturbance are three life strategies commonly used to categorize plants based on environment: (1) C-competitors, (2) S-stress tolerators, and (3) R-ruderals. There is no viable strategy for plants in high stress and high disturbance environments, therefore categorization for this habitat type is absent.

Each life strategy varies in trade-offs of resource allocation to seed production, leaf morphology, leaf longevity, relative growth rate, and other factors, which can be summarized as allocation to (1) growth, (2) reproduction, and (3) maintenance. Competitors are primarily composed of species with high relative growth rate, short leaf-life, relatively low seed production, and high allocation to leaf construction. They persist in high nutrient, low disturbance environments, and “rapidly monopolize resource capture by the spatially-dynamic foraging of roots and shoots.” Stress-tolerators, found in high stress, low disturbance habitats, allocate resources to maintenance and defenses, such as anti-herbivory. Species are often evergreen with small, long-lived leaves or needles, slow resource turnover, and low plasticity and relative growth rate. Due to high stress conditions, vegetative growth and reproduction are reduced. Ruderals, inhabiting low stress, high disturbance regimes, allocate resources mainly to seed reproduction and are often annuals or short-lived perennials. Common characteristics of ruderal species include high relative growth rate, short-lived leaves, and short statured plants with minimal lateral expansion.

== Tilman’s R* Rule ==
G. David Tilman developed the R* rule in support of resource competition theory. Theoretically, a plant species growing in monoculture, and utilizing a single limiting resource, will deplete the resource until reaching an equilibrium level where growth and losses are balanced. The concentration of the resource at the equilibrium level is termed R*; This is the minimum concentration at which the plant is able to persist in the environment. Population growth is indicated by values greater than the R*. Conversely, population decline is associated with values lower than the R*. If two species are competing for the same limiting resource, the superior competitor will have the lowest R* value for that resource. This will eventually lead to the displacement of the inferior competitor, regardless of initial plant densities. Displacement rate depends on the magnitude of the difference in R*. Greater differences lead to a faster exclusion. Every plant species differs in R* values due to differences in plant morphology and physiology. The realized R* level is dependent on physical factors that vary by habitat, such as temperature, pH, and humidity.

== Westoby’s L-H-S Strategy ==
In 1998, Mark Westoby proposed a plant ecology strategy scheme (PESS) to explain species distributions based on traits. The dynamic model incorporated a three-axis trade-off among specific leaf area (SLA), canopy height at maturity, and seed mass. SLA is defined as the area per unit dry mass of mature leaves, developed in the fullest natural light of the species. These traits were selected for incorporation because of their trade-off functionality. Resource allocation to one trait is only possible by diverting resources from the others. Similarly to Grime's C-S-R triangle, each gradient represents different strategic responses to the environment; variation in disturbance adaptation is represented by canopy height and seed mass (Grime's R-axis), whereas SLA reflects variation in growth in response to stress (Grime's C-S axis). The L-H-S strategy avoids the assumption that high disturbance, high stress environments lack viable plant strategies, unlike Grime's model. However, Westoby's model is at a disadvantage when predicting potential variation in plant strategies since the axes only include single variables, compared to Grime's multivariable axes.

== r/K Selection ==
This linear model, first introduced by MacArthur and Wilson (1967), has been commonly applied to both plants and animals to describe reproductive strategies. Representing opposing extremes of a continuum, r-species commit all energy into maximizing seed production with minimal input to individual propagules, whereas K-species allocate energy into a few, highly fit individuals; this is a spectrum of quantity versus quality. The model assumes that perfect r-species function under competition-free environments with no density effects and K-species under maximum competitive and density saturation. Most species are categorized as intermediates between both extremes.

== Summary ==
The term “plant strategies” has many definitions, and includes several different mechanisms for responding to one's environment. While different strategies focus on different plant characteristics, all strategies have an overarching theme: plants must make trade-offs between where and how to allocate resources. Whether that's allocation to growth, reproduction, or maintenance, plants are responding to their environment by employing strategies that allow them to persist, survive, and reproduce. Plants may have multiple strategies to survive at different life-stages and therefore be subject to multiple trade-offs throughout their life-cycle.

== See also ==
- Annual vs. perennial plant evolution
