= Carmen Cid =

Urban wetland ecologist

Carmen Cid is a Latin American urban wetland ecologist and faculty member at Eastern Connecticut State University. She focuses on ecology education and diversity in science. Cid is a fellow of the Ecological Society of America (ESA)

== Early life and education ==
Her father shared his interest in biology with her when she was young by taking her to Natural History Museums in Havana, Cuba, and New York City. She became more interested in biology in high school, but did not realize her interest in wetland ecology until she was on a field trip in a Plant Ecology course her junior year of college. Cid graduated cum laude with a degree in Biology from New York University. She then went to a master’s program at Ohio State University where she graduated with a degree in Botany. In 1984, she got her PhD in Botany and Plant Pathology from Michigan State University.

== Career and research ==
Carmen Cid began her ecology career by teaching biology at Truman State University in 1985. In 1987, Cid left that position to teach at Eastern Connecticut State University, where in 2005, she was appointed dean of the School of Arts and Sciences. She still holds these positions. Cid was elected a fellow of the ESA in 2017, and in 2020, she was announced as a board member serving from 2021 to 2024.

Cid is involved in a number initiatives for advancing urban ecology curriculum and implementing leadership programs for recruiting and retaining undergraduate women and minorities in ecology. She helped establish Strategies for Ecology Education, Diversity and Sustainability (SEEDS), an award-winning mentorship program for minority undergraduate students. She was also one of the founding members of Gender and Minority Affairs Committee and the chair from 1991 to 1994. She helped to write the first report on Women and Under-represented Groups in Ecology (WAMIE) which encouraged the widespread implementation of programs and curriculum to increase recruitment and retention of women and minorities in ecology.

== Awards and honors ==
In 2009, Cid was given funding by the National Science Foundation for her research with Organizational Change for Gender Equity in STEM Academic Professions (ADVANCE). In 2012, she won the ESA Diversity Award (now called Commitment to Human Diversity Award). That year she was also awarded Connecticut ACE Women’s Network Distinguished Leadership in Higher Education Award and Connecticut’s Latina Citizen of the Year. Most recently, Carmen Cid was awarded the 2020 Connecticut Science Center’s STEM Achievement Award.

== Publications ==
- 2020. Cid, C. R. and M. Brunson. Engaging faculty in preparing students for non-academic environmental careers. Frontiers in Ecology and the Environment 18: 52-53.
- 2019. Klemow, K., A. Berkowitz, C. Cid and G. Middendorf. Improving ecological education through a four-dimensional framework. Frontiers in Ecology and the Environment 15: 1.
- 2017. Klemow, K., G. Bowser, C. Cid, G. Middendorf, T. Mourad and J. Herrick. Exploring ecological careers - a new Frontiers series. Frontiers in Ecology and the Environment 15: 336-337.
- 2015. Cid, C. and G. Bowser. Breaking down the barriers to diversity in ecology. Frontiers in Ecology and the Environment 13:1.
- 2013. Cid, C. R. and R. Pouyat. Making ecology relevant to decision making: the human-centered place-based approach. Frontiers in Ecology and the Environment 11:447-448.
