= Peperomia warmingii =

Scientific classification
- Kingdom: Plantae
- Clade: Embryophytes
- Clade: Tracheophytes
- Clade: Spermatophytes
- Clade: Angiosperms
- Clade: Magnoliids
- Order: Piperales
- Family: Piperaceae
- Genus: Peperomia
- Species: P. warmingii

Binomial name
- Peperomia warmingii C.DC.

Species of flowering plant native to Brazil

Peperomia warmingii is a species of Peperomia subshrub native to Minas Gerais, Brazil. It grows in wet tropical biomes. It produces drupes.

== Etymology ==
The species' epithet warmingii came from the surname of Johannes Eugenius Bülow Warming, who was a Danish botanist and ecologist from Copenhagen that had written a textbook about plant ecology.
