= Lavorel =

Lavorel is a surname. Notable people with the surname include:

- Henri Lavorel (1914–1955), French film director
- Sandra Lavorel (born 1965), French ecologist
