= Jacob Weiner =

American-Danish plant ecologist

Jacob Weiner (born Robert Milton Weiner; 1947 in Brooklyn, New York) is a plant ecologist at the University of Copenhagen. Weiner has made contributions to several areas of plant ecology, including competition, allocation, allometry and application of ecological knowledge to agricultural production.

== Education and Appointments ==
Weiner received his B.A. from Antioch College, M.Sc. from the University of Michigan, and Ph.D. from the University of Oregon. He served on the faculty at Swarthmore College for 18 years, where he taught courses in botany and ecology and pursued basic research on plant growth, competition, allocation and allometry. During his time at Swarthmore, he had research leaves at Harvard University, University College of North Wales, the Smithsonian Environmental Research Center, Imperial College at Silwood Park and Research Center Jülich. In 1996 he left Swarthmore to take a position at Royal Veterinary and Agricultural University (now part of the University of Copenhagen) in Denmark. In 2007-2008 he was a Sabbatical Fellow at the National Center for Ecological Analysis & Synthesis. He has been adjunct professor at Lanzhou University and Beijing Normal University. Weiner was in the first group of ISI Highly-Cited Researchers and was named Distinguished Fellow of the Botanical Society of America in 2016, and Fellow of the British Ecological Society in 2026. He was granted the Danish Knight's Cross of the Order of the Dannebrog in 2012.

== Research ==
Weiner has pursued research in several areas of ecology, including (1) plant competition at the individual and population levels, (2) plant growth and resource allocation, (3) individual variation within plant populations and (4) the application of ecological and evolutionary theory to plant production systems. He is associated with an approach to ecology that is both theoretical and empirical, analytical, mechanistic and employs simple models to generate testable hypotheses.

Contributions include

- The first spatially explicit simulation model of plant competition and dispersal (Weiner & Conte 1981).
- The analysis of plant-plant interactions at the individual level: "neighborhood models of plant competition" (Weiner 1984; Weiner et al. 2001).
- Introduction of measures of inequality into ecological research (Weiner & Solbrig 1984), where they have become widely used in the analysis of individual size (and other) distributions. In collaboration with Christian Damgaard, Weiner developed a new inequality statistic, the Lorenz asymmetry coefficient (Damgaard & Weiner 2000), which is now being used in engineering and social sciences as well as ecology.
- Leading researcher in developing and clarifying the concept of "size-asymmetric competition", which is widely applied in ecology. He provided conclusive evidence of its importance as a major source of size variation within plant populations (Weiner 1985; Weiner & Thomas 1986; Weiner 1990) and has contributed to understanding the mechanisms involved (Schwinning & Weiner 1998).
- The first compelling evidence that density-dependent mortality (“self-thinning”) in plants is driven by competition for light (Weiner 1988a)
- Reframing of plant allocation in terms of allometry rather than ratios (Weiner 1988b; Weiner 2004; Weiner et al. 2009; Weiner et al. 2021), which is changing the conceptualization and analysis of plant allocation strategies.
- A theoretical framework and empirical support demonstrating the potential for weed suppression by cereal crops through increased crop density and spatial uniformity (Weiner et al. 2001; Olsen et al. 2005; Weiner 2023).
- Application of ecological knowledge to increase agricultural sustainability (Weiner 2003; 2017)
- Application of evolutionary theory in agricultural research (Weiner et al. 2010; Weiner et al. 2017; Weiner 2019)

== Selected publications ==
- Weiner, J. & Conte, P.T. (1981). Dispersal and neighborhood effects in an annual plant competition model. Ecological Modelling 13, 131-147. Doi 10.1016/0304-3800(81)90048-X
- Weiner, J. & Solbrig, O.T. (1984) The meaning and measurement of size hierarchies in plant populations. Oecologia (Berlin) 61, 334-336, Doi 10.1007/Bf00379630.
- Weiner, J. (1984) Neighborhood interference amongst Pinus rigida individuals. Journal of Ecology 72, 183-195, Doi 10.2307/2260012
- Weiner, J. & Thomas, S.C. (1986) Size variability and competition in plant monocultures. Oikos 47, 211-222, Doi 10.2307/3566048
- Weiner, J. (1988a) Variation in the performance of individuals in plant populations. In Plant Population Ecology (eds A.J. Davy, M.J. Hutchings & A.R. Watkinson) Blackwell Scientific Publications, pp. 59–81
- Weiner, J. (1988b) The influence of competition on plant reproduction. In Plant Reproductive Ecology: Patterns and Strategies (eds J. Lovett Doust & L. Lovett Doust) Oxford University Press, pp. 228–245.
- Weiner, J. (1990) Asymmetric competition in plant populations. Trends in Ecology and Evolution 5, 360-364, Doi 10.1016/0169-5347(90)90095-U.
- Schwinning, S. & Weiner, J. (1998) Mechanisms determining the degree of size-asymmetry in competition among plants. Oecologia 113, 447-455. Doi 10.1007/S004420050397
- Damgaard, C. & Weiner, J. 2000. Describing inequality in plant size or fecundity. Ecology 81, 1139-1142. Doi 10.1890/0012-9658(2000)081[1139:DIIPSO]2.0.CO;2
- Weiner, J., Stoll, P., Muller-Landau, H. & Jasentuliyana, A. (2001). The effects of density, spatial pattern, and competitive symmetry on size variation in simulated plant populations. American Naturalist 158, 438-450. Doi 10.1086/321988
- Weiner, J., Griepentrog, H.-W. & Kristensen, L. (2001) Suppression of weeds by spring wheat (Triticum aestivum) increases with crop density and spatial uniformity. Journal of Applied Ecology 38, 784-790, Doi 10.1046/j.1365-2664.2001.00634.X.
- Weiner, J. (2003) Ecology - the science of agriculture in the 21st century. Journal of Agricultural Science 141, 371-377, Doi 10.1017/S0021859603003605.
- Weiner, J. (2004) Allocation, plasticity and allometry in plants. Perspectives in Plant Ecology Evolution and Systematics 6, 207-215. Doi 10.1078/1433-8319-00083
- Olsen, J., Kristensen, L., Weiner, J. & Griepentrog, H.-W. (2005) Increased density and spatial uniformity increases weed suppression by spring wheat (Triticum aestivum). Weed Research 45, 316-321. Doi 10.1111/j.1365-3180.2005.00456.x
- Weiner, J., Campbell, L.G., Pino, J. & Echarte, L. (2009). The allometry of reproduction within plant populations. Journal of Ecology 97,1220-1233. Doi 10.1111/j.1365-2745.2009.01559.x
- Weiner, J., Andersen, S.B., Wille, W.K.M., Griepentrog, H.W. & Olsen, J.M. (2010) Evolutionary Agroecology: the potential for cooperative, high density, weed-suppressing cereals. Evolutionary Applications 3, 473-475, Doi 10.1111/j.1752-4571.2010.00144.x.
- Weiner, J., Du, Y.-L., Zhang, C., Qin, X.-L. & Li, F.-M. (2017). Evolutionary Agroecology: individual fitness and population yield in wheat (Triticum aestivum). Ecology 98, 2261-2266. Doi 10.1002/ecy.1934
- Weiner, J. (2019). Looking in the wrong direction for higher-yielding crop genotypes. Trends in Plant Science 24, 927-933. Doi 10.1016/j.tplants.2019.07.001
- Weiner, J., Du, Y.-L., Zhao, Y.-M. & Li, F.-M. (2021) Allometry and yield stability of cereals. Frontiers in Plant Science 12. Doi: 10.3389/fpls.2021.681490
- Weiner, J. (2023) Weed suppression by cereals: Beyond "competitive ability". Weed Research 63, 133-138. Doi: 10.1111/wre.12572
