= Plant density =

Number of individual plants present per unit of ground area

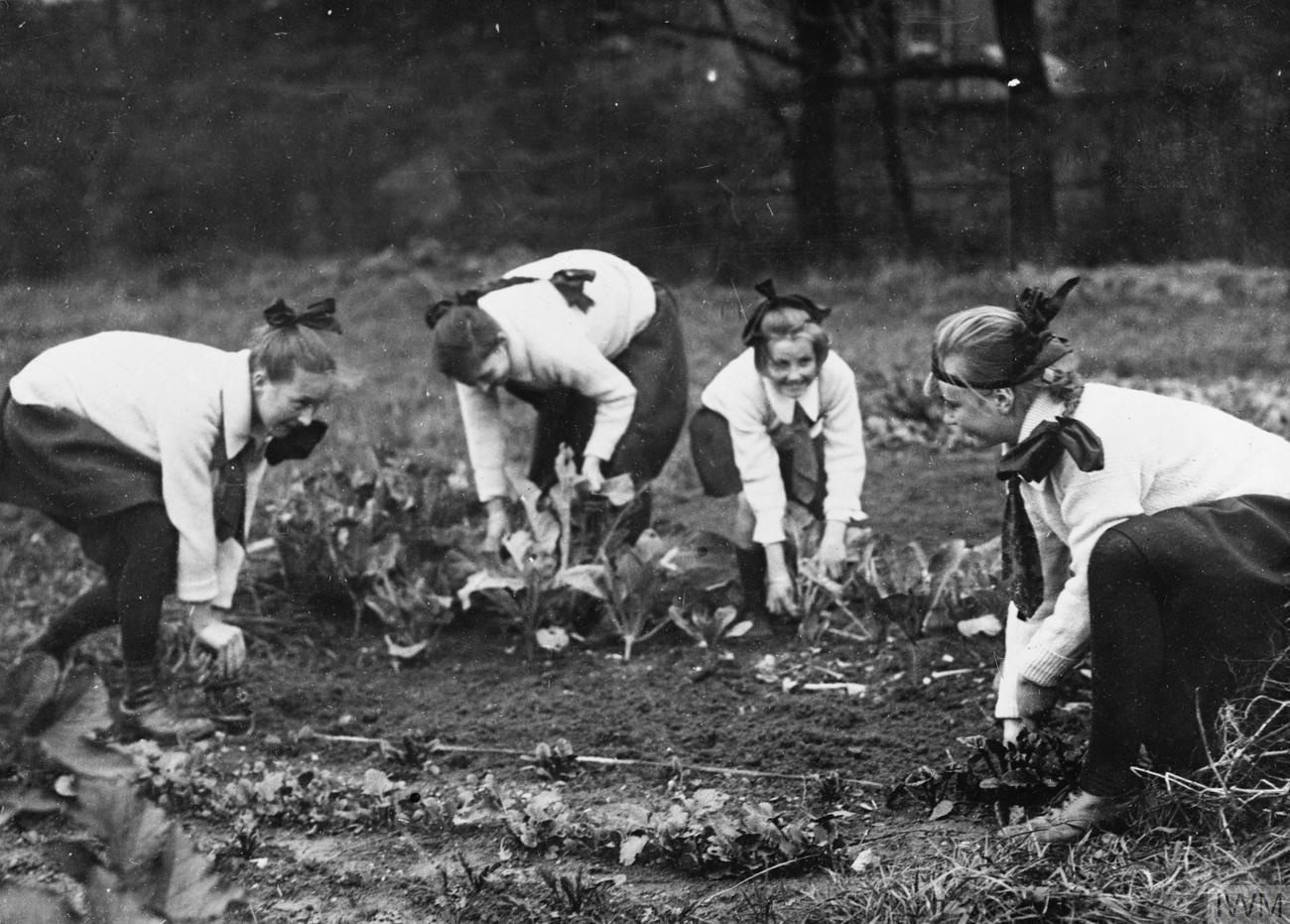
Schoolchildren measuring the distance between plants in an allotment garden during World War I

Plant density is the number of individual plants present per unit of ground area. It is most easily interpreted in the case of monospecific stands, where all plants belong to the same species and have germinated at the same time. However, it could also indicate the number of individual plants found at a given location.

== Definition and concepts ==
Plant density is defined as the number of plants present per unit area of ground. In nature, plant densities can be especially high when seeds present in a seed bank germinate after winter, or in a forest understory after a tree fall opens a gap in the canopy. Due to competition for light, nutrients and water, individual plants will not be able to take up all resources that are required for optimal growth. This indicates that plant density not only depends on the space available to grow but it is also determined by the amount of resources available. Especially in the case of light, smaller plants will take up fewer resources than bigger plants, even less than would be expected on the basis of their size differences. As plant density increases it will affect the structure of the plant as well as the developmental patterns of the plant. This is called asymmetric competition, and will cause some subordinate plants to die off in a process that has been named 'self-thinning'. The remaining plants perform better as fewer plants will now compete for resources. A key factor in agronomy and forestry is plant population density, which provides an experimental approach for better understanding plant-plant competition.

== Monostands ==
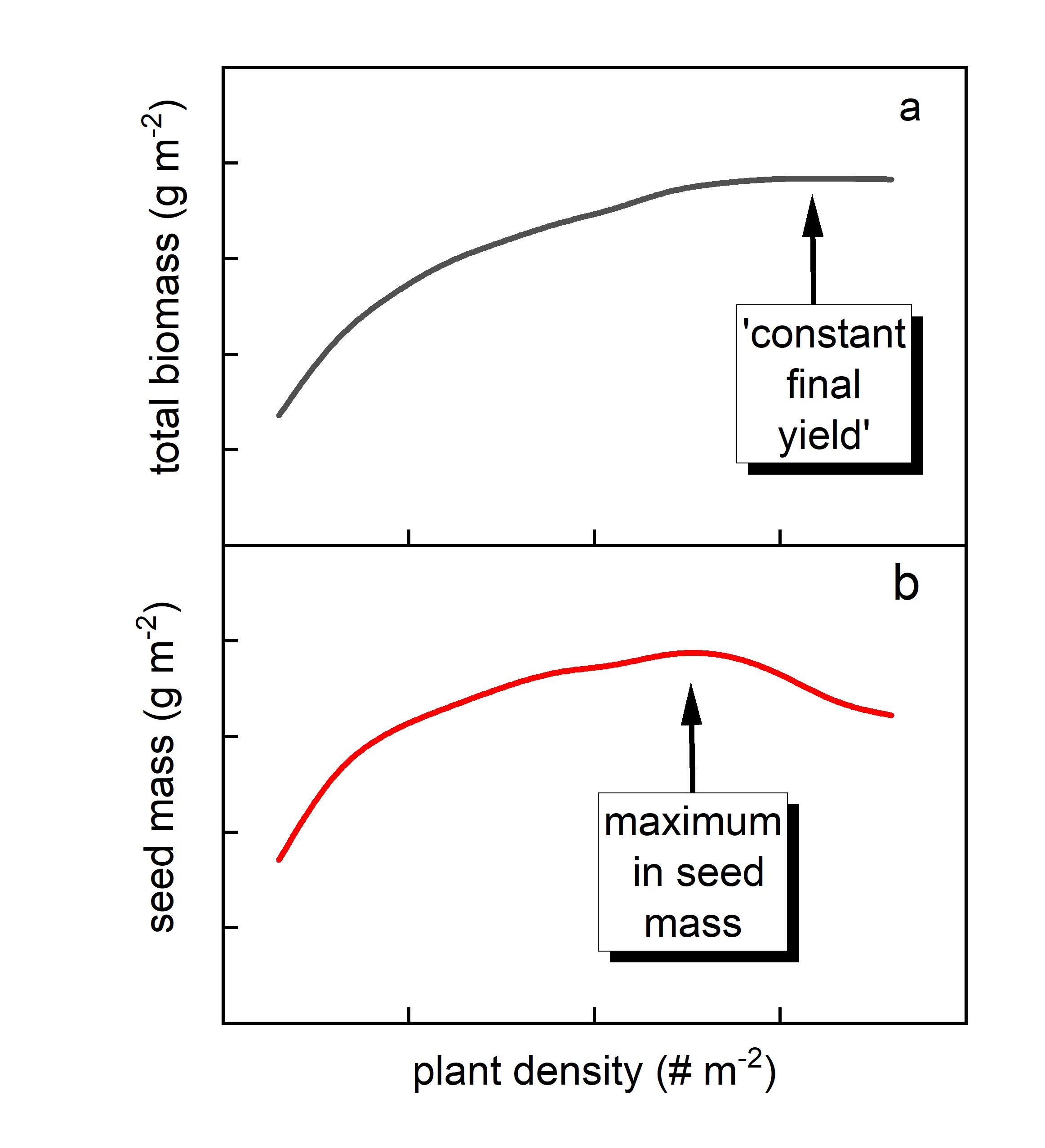
Effect of plant density on (a) total shoot mass and (b) seed mass per unit ground area. Schematised figure, inspired a.o. by experiments with maize by Li et al. (2015).

Many of the processes related to plant density can well be studied in monocultures of even-aged individuals that are sown or planted at the same time. These can be referred to as 'monostands' and are often studied in the context of agricultural, horticultural or silvicultural questions. However, they are also highly relevant in ecology. In general, the total above-ground biomass of a monostand increases with increasing density, up to the point where the biomass saturates. This is what has been dubbed 'constant final yield', and refers to the total plant biomass per unit ground area. Seed production per ground area is not constant, but often declines with density after total biomass per ground area reaches its maximum value.

== Plant density and self-thinning ==
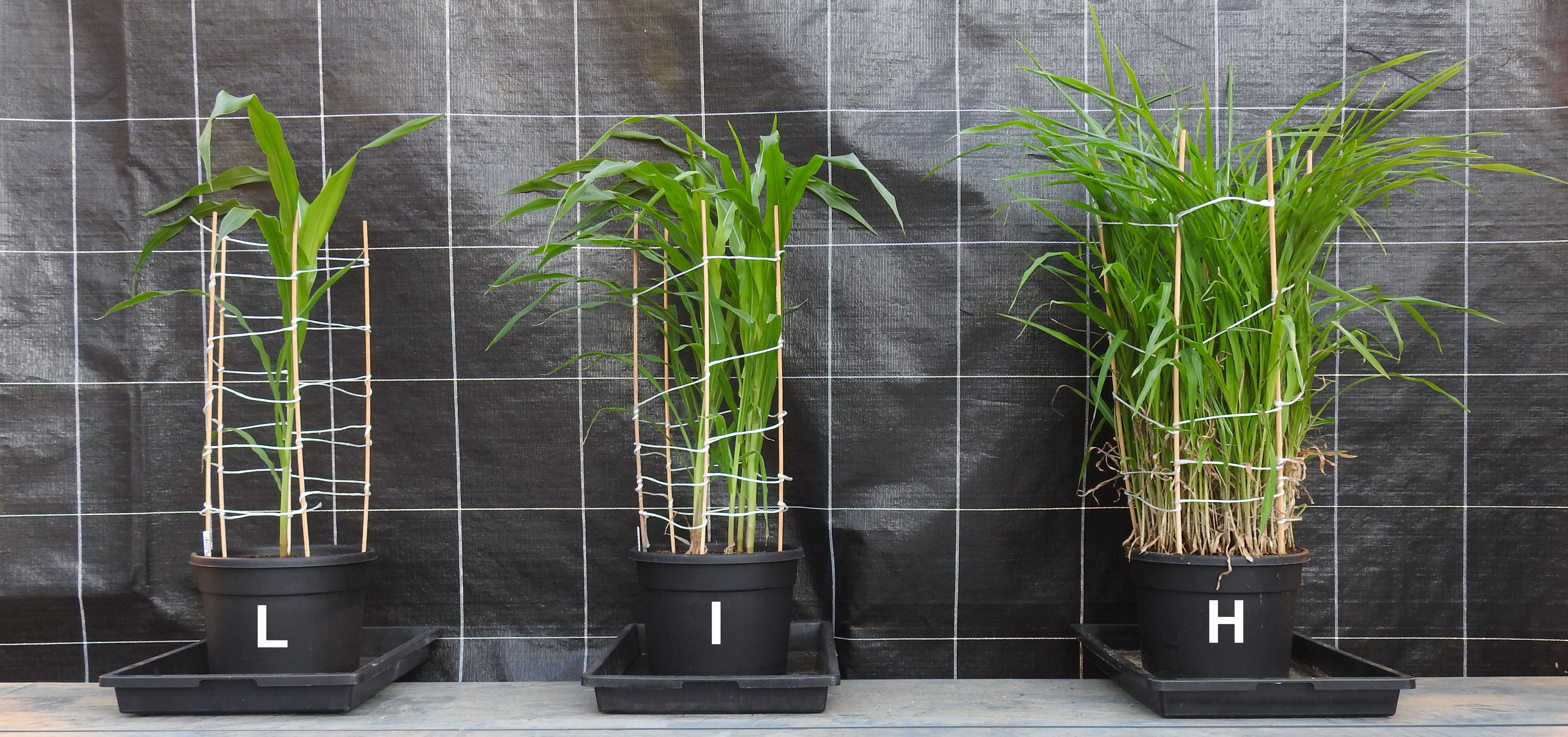
Effect of a low (L), intermediate (I) and high (H) plant density on Maize.

Higher plant density results in spatial crowding, which causes a reduction in resource efficiency and limits plant growth. Self-thinning is driven by a low amount of resources available to a plant. Because resources are limited in areas with a higher population, some individuals must die so others may grow. Abiotic stressors including low nutrient availability caused by increased density or limitations in shade and water due to increased drought are the main drivers of self-thinning. In agriculture, farmers avoid very high densities as they do not contribute to seed yield. The optimal densities vary based on desired plant size, location and a variety of environmental factors and range from 7,500 plants per acre for Maize to 900,000-1 million for Winter Wheat. In forestry, normal densities are less than 0.1 plants per square meter. Not only the biomass per square meter increases with density, but also the Leaf Area Index (LAI, leaf area per ground area). The higher the Leaf Area Index, the higher the fraction of intercepted sunlight will be, but the gain in light interception and photosynthesis will not match the increase in LAI, and this is the reason that total biomass per ground area saturates at high plant densities.

== The individual plant in a monostand ==
=== Biomass ===
Contrary to the total biomass per unit ground area, which increases with density until reaching saturation, the average biomass of individual plants in a monostand strongly declines with plant density, such that for every doubling in density individual plants will become ~30-40% smaller. Plants in higher density stands invest relatively more of their biomass in stems (higher Stem Mass Fraction), and less in leaves and roots.

Apart from their weight, plants will change their phenotype in many other ways and at different integration levels:

=== Leaves ===
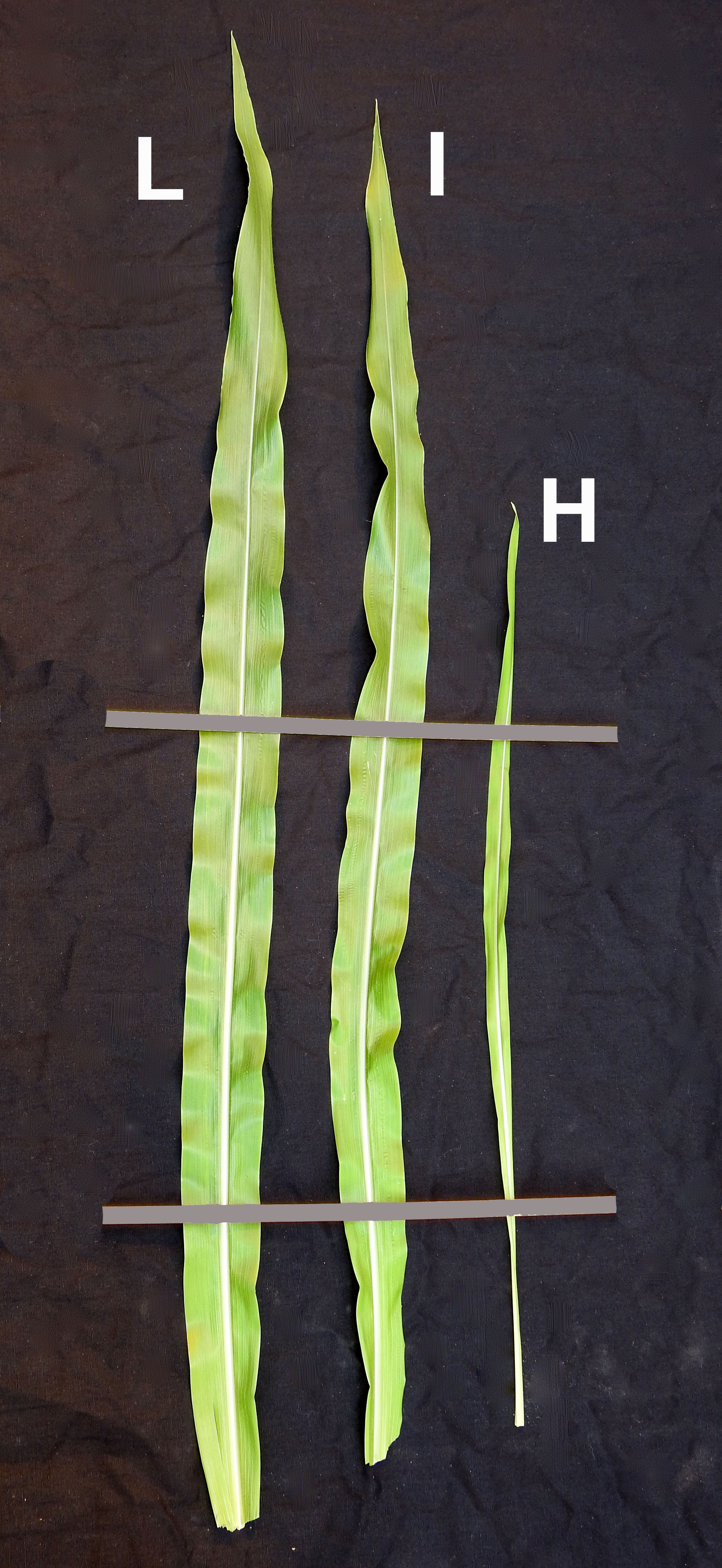
Leaf size of the largest full-grown leaf of Maize plants grown at a low (L), intermediate (I), and high (H) plant density.

Individual plants in dense stands have fewer leaves and they are often smaller and more narrow (see photo). Leaves of high-density plants are thinner (higher SLA – leaf area per unit mass), especially lower in the vegetation, with a similar concentration of nitrogen per unit mass, but a lower nitrogen content per area.

=== Stems ===
Average plant height or vegetation height often remains remarkably similar, but a very consistent difference is that the stems of high-density plants have a much smaller diameter. They also have fewer side shoots (tillers) in the case of grasses, or branches in the case of herbs and trees.

=== Roots ===
Root growth in environments with high plant density shows that there will be fewer roots per plant but the length and general density of the individual root remains somewhat the same, this is expected to still cause issues for the plant in future growth.

=== Physiology ===
In dense stands, there is a strong gradient of light from top to bottom. Lower leaves in high-density stands will therefore have a lower photosynthetic rate and a lower transpiration rate than similar leaves of plants in open stands. There are indications that also the well-illuminated top leaves may have a lower photosynthetic capacity in densely-grown plants.

=== Seed production ===
Because densely-grown plants are smaller, they will also produce fewer seeds per individual. But also the seed production as a fraction of total plant biomass (harvest index) is lower, and so is the seed weight of an individual seed.

== See also ==
- Intraspecific competition
