= Universal adaptive strategy theory =

Theoretical ecology

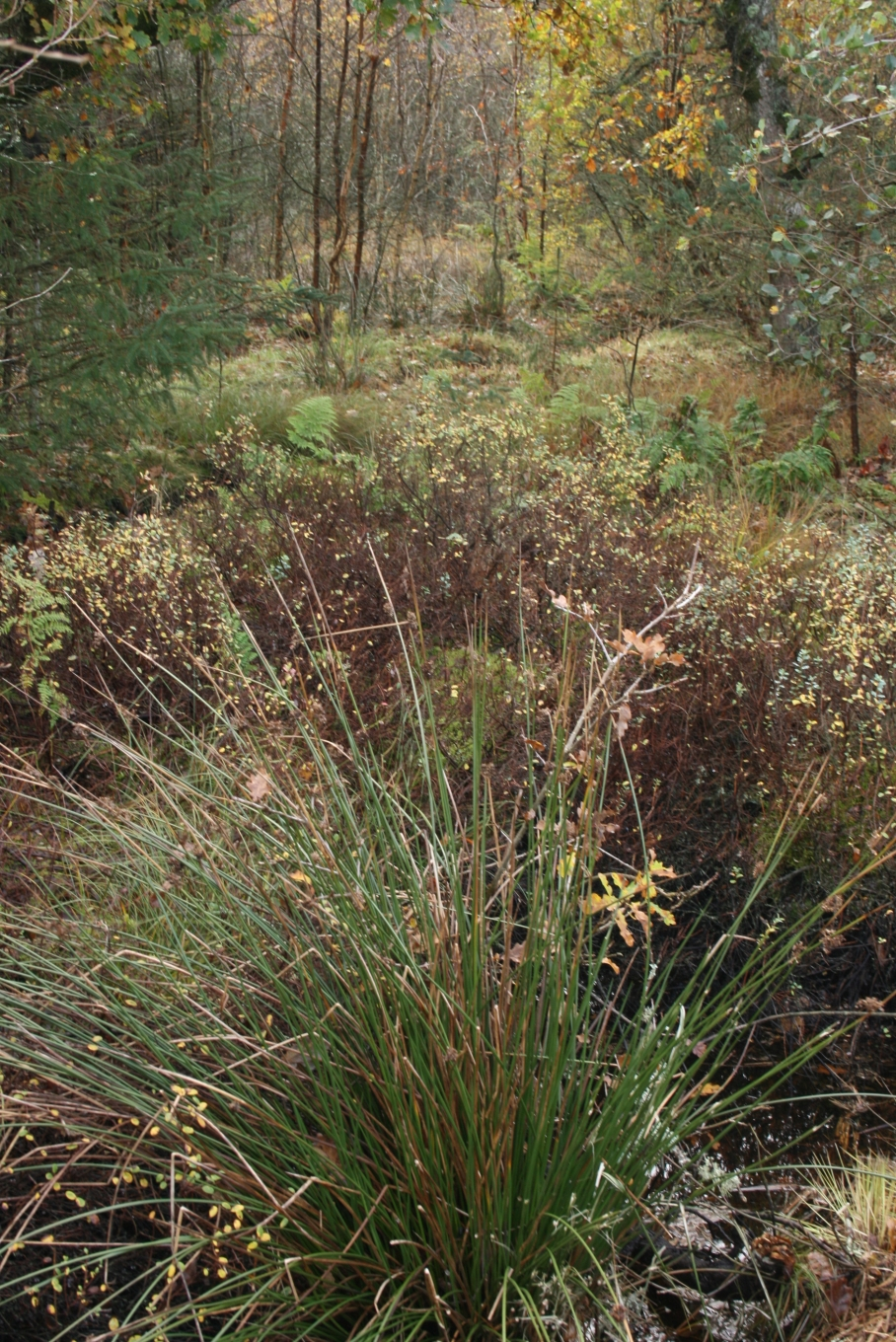
Plants with an S-strategy: In the foreground Juncus effusus, and behind that Vaccinium uliginosum, Athyrium filix-femina and Betula pubescens. Bog habitat in Tversted Plantation, Denmark.

Universal adaptive strategy theory (UAST) is an evolutionary theory developed by J. Philip Grime in collaboration with Simon Pierce describing the general limits to ecology and evolution based on the trade-off that organisms face when the resources they gain from the environment are allocated between either growth, maintenance or regeneration – known as the universal three-way trade-off.

== General theory ==
A universal three-way trade-off produces adaptive strategies throughout the tree of life, with extreme strategies facilitating the survival of genes via: C (competitive), the survival of the individual using traits that maximize resource acquisition and resource control in consistently productive niches; S (stress-tolerant), individual survival via maintenance of metabolic performance in variable and unproductive niches; or R (ruderal), rapid gene propagation via rapid completion of the lifecycle and regeneration in niches where events are frequently lethal to the individual.

It is impossible for an organism to evolve a survival strategy in which all resources are devoted exclusively to one of these investment paths, but relatively extreme strategies exist, with a range of intermediates. The system can be represented by a triangle, with the three extreme possibilities at its vertices. The different species may be located at some particular point inside this triangle, accommodating a certain percentage of each of the three strategies.

It is possible to use multivariate statistics to determine the main trends in phenotypic variability in a range of organisms, which for various major animal groups (most prominently vertebrates), has been shown to have three main endpoints consistent with UAST.

UAST is a key part of the twin-filter model describing how species with similar overall strategies but divergent sets of minor traits coexist in ecological communities.

== C-S-R Triangle theory ==
C-S-R Triangle theory is the application of UAST to plant biology. The three strategies are competitor, stress tolerator, and ruderal. These strategies each thrive best in a unique combination of either high or low intensities of stress and disturbance.

=== Competitors ===
Competitors are plant species that thrive in areas of low intensity stress (moisture deficit) and disturbance and excel in biological competition. These species are able to outcompete other plants by most efficiently tapping into available resources. Competitors do this through a combination of favorable characteristics, including rapid growth rate, high productivity (growth in height, lateral spread, and root mass), and high capacity for phenotypic plasticity. This last feature allows competitors to be highly flexible in morphology and adjust the allocation of resources throughout the various parts of the plant as needed over the course of the growing season.

=== Stress tolerators ===
Stress tolerators are plant species that live in areas of high intensity stress and low intensity disturbance. Species that have adapted this strategy generally have slow growth rates, long-lived leaves, high rates of nutrient retention, and low phenotypic plasticity. Stress tolerators respond to environmental stresses through physiological variability. These species are often found in stressful environments such as alpine or arid habitats, deep shade, nutrient deficient soils, and areas of extreme pH levels.

=== Ruderals ===
Ruderals are plant species that prosper in situations of high intensity disturbance and low intensity stress. These species are fast-growing and rapidly complete their life cycles, and generally produce large amounts of seeds. Plants that have adopted this strategy are often found colonizing recently disturbed land, such as agricultural soils, and are often annuals.

== Relation to the R* theory ==
Understanding the differences between the CSR theory and its major alternative the R* theory has been a major goal in community ecology for many years. Unlike the R* theory that predicts that competitive ability is determined by the ability to grow under low levels of resources, the CSR theory predicts that competitive ability is determined by relative growth rate and other size related traits. While some experiments supported the R* predictions, others supported the CSR predictions. The different predictions stem from different assumptions on the size asymmetry of the competition. The R* theory assumes that competition is size symmetric (i.e. resource exploitation is proportional to individual biomass), the CSR theory assumes that competition is size-asymmetric (i.e. large individuals exploit disproportionately higher amounts of resources compared with smaller individuals).

== See also ==
- Sørensen similarity index
