= J. Philip Grime =

British ecologist (1935–2021)

Philip Grime FRS
- Born: John Philip Grime; 30 April 1935; Manchester
- Died: 19 April 2021 (aged 85); Sheffield
- Education: University of Sheffield (PhD)
- Known for: Universal adaptive strategy theory Intermediate disturbance hypothesis
- Awards: Alexander von Humboldt Medal (2011)
- Scientific career
- Fields: Ecology
- Workplaces: University of Sheffield; Connecticut Agricultural Experiment Station
- Thesis: A study of the ecology of a group of Derbyshire plants with particular reference to their nutrient requirements (1960)
- Website: www.sheffield.ac.uk/aps/staff-and-students/acadstaff/pgrime

John Philip Grime FRS (30 April 1935 – 19 April 2021) was an ecologist and emeritus professor at the University of Sheffield. He is best known for the universal adaptive strategy theory (UAST) and the twin filter model of community assembly with Simon Pierce, eco-evolutionary dynamics, the unimodal relationship between species richness and site productivity ("humped-back model"), the intermediate disturbance hypothesis, and DST classification (dominants, subordinates and transients).

Grime's 1979 book Plant Strategies and Vegetation Processes has been cited more than 1,200 times. Together with many influential scientific papers, it has made him a highly cited scientist. In an interview Grime has stated that "Ecology lacks a Periodic Table", quoting Richard Southwood.

== Education ==
Grime obtained his PhD from University of Sheffield in 1960.

== Career and research ==
Grime joined the staff of the department of botany at Sheffield in 1961. He worked at the Connecticut Agricultural Experiment Station, US from 1963 to 1964. He then returned to the University of Sheffield and joined the unit of comparative plant ecology, which had been founded in 1961 by professor Ian H. Rorison. Grime served as deputy director of the Natural Environmental Research Council Unit of Comparative Plant Ecology from 1964 to 1989 and as director from 1989.

=== Plant strategies ===
His work and his theories are focused on plant strategies, as developed along their evolutionary history. His CSR theory says that each plant species has a blend of the three strategies that he labels C (competitive), S (stress tolerant) and R (ruderal, or rapid propagation). Ruderal strategists thrive in disturbed areas. He has described a method to classify herbaceous vegetations by analysing the importance of the three strategies in the genotypes of the species that are present.

=== Selected publications ===
- The Evolutionary Strategies that Shape Ecosystems
- "Vegetation classification by reference to strategies"
- Evidence for the existence of three primary strategies in plants and its relevance to ecological and evolutionary theory
- Plant Strategies and Vegetation Processes
- Plant Strategies, Vegetation Processes, and Ecosystem Properties. (2nd much expanded edition of the above)
- Benefits of plant diversity to ecosystems: immediate, filter and founder effects
- "Trait convergence and trait divergence in herbaceous plant communities: mechanisms and consequencesre"
- "Plant strategy theories: a comment on Craine"

=== Awards and honours ===
In 1991, Grime was inducted as a foreign member of the Royal Netherlands Academy of Arts and Sciences. In 1997, he won the Marsh Ecology Award from the British Ecological Society and was awarded honorary membership of the Ecological Society of America. He was also Distinguished Visiting Ecologist at Pennsylvania State University in that year. In 1998, he was elected Fellow of the Royal Society (FRS) and honorary doctor at University of Nijmegen. He has been honorary member of the British Ecological Society since 1999. He was the first ever recipient of the Alexander von Humboldt Medal (2011) for his outstanding contribution to the intellectual development of plant community ecology.

In 2013, the Journal of Ecology published a collection of Grime's most influential papers, for which he wrote a blog post and recorded an accompanying podcast interview.
