= International Association for Vegetation Science =

International scientific organization

- Abbreviation: IAVS
- Website: www.iavs.org

The International Association for Vegetation Science (IAVS) promotes contact between scientists and others interested in the study of vegetation ecology, promotes research and publication of research results. In 1939 the International Phytosociological Society (IPS) was founded, with its headquarters in Montpellier, France. After the Second World War it was reconstituted as the Internationale Vereinigung für Vegetationskunde (IVV), which adopted a constitution at the International Botanical Congress of 1954. The current name was adopted in 1981–82.

== History ==
In 1939, the predecessor organization of the IAVS was founded as the International Phytosociological Society (IPS) with headquarters in Montpellier. After World War II, a meeting of former members and new interested parties was held in Amsterdam in 1949. In 1954, at the International Botanical Congress in Paris, the International Phytosociological Society was re-founded as the International Association for Plant Science (IVV). Reinhold Tuxen and Willem Karel de Leeuw were the founding members of this organization. This organization was primarily intended for German-speaking Europe, and it held annual international conferences from 1956 to 1981. These conferences soon became the most important meetings related to vegetation, first in Europe and later even worldwide. In 1981-1982, a new form of organization was created with new statutes.

== Publications ==
The society publishes:

- IAVS Bulletin
- Journal of Vegetation Science
- Applied Vegetation Science

== Awards ==
The Alexander von Humboldt Medal is a prize awarded biennially from 2011 onwards by the association. The award is intended to honor scientists who have contributed greatly to the intellectual development and advancement of vegetation science and plant community ecology. Honorary membership is also bestowed by the society.

=== Medal recipients ===
- 2011 J. Philip Grime
- 2013 David Tilman
- 2015 Sandra Lavorel
- 2017 F. Stuart Chapin III
- 2019 Pierre Legendre (Canada)
- 2025 Jens-Christian Svenning (Denmark)
