= Edgar Nelson Transeau =

American botanist & phycologist (1875-1960)

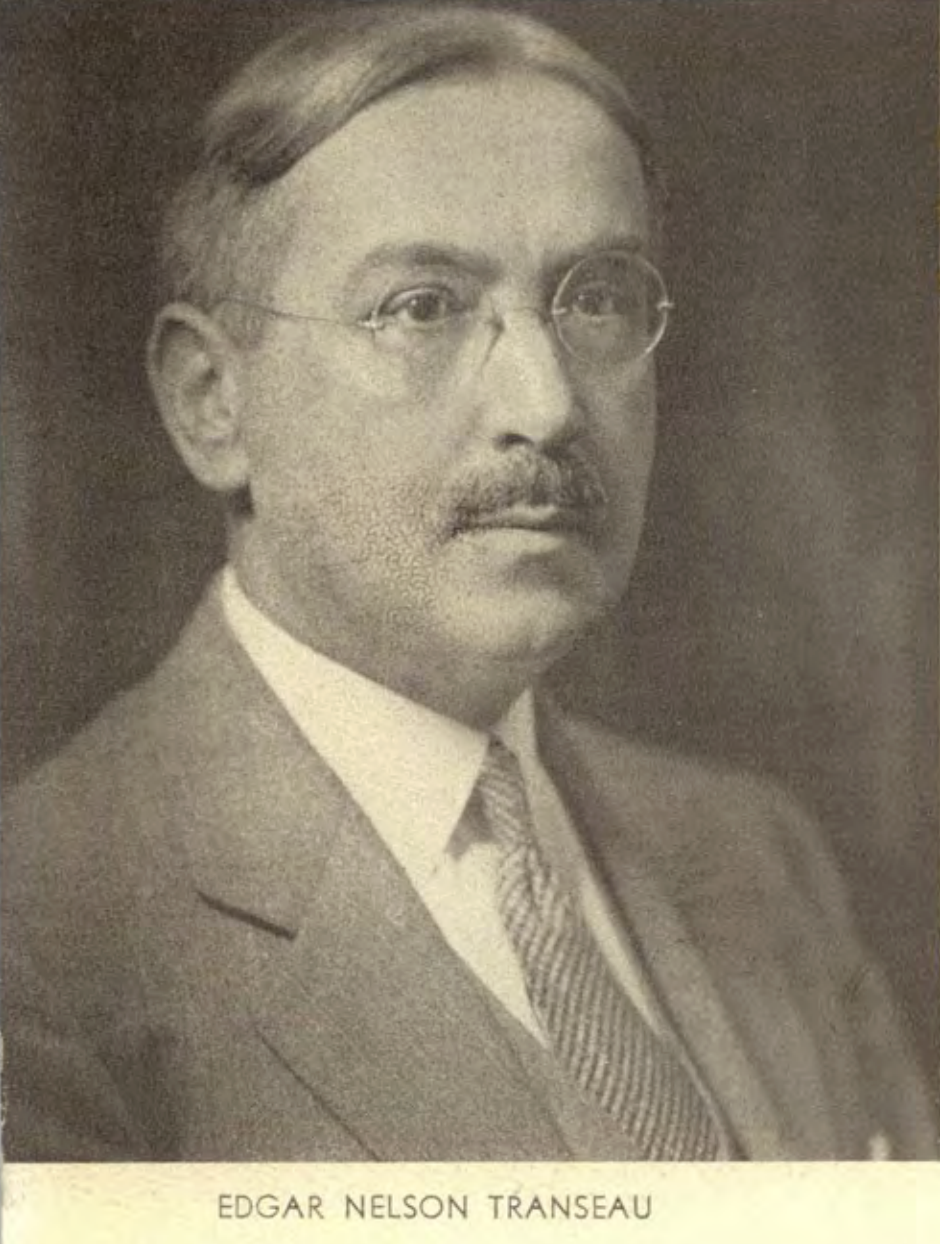
Portrait of Transeau (1875-1960)

Edgar Nelson Transeau (1875–1960) was an American botanist and phycologist known for his work in plant ecology and phytogeography. He is best remembered for his influential paper, "The Prairie Peninsula" published in Ecology in 1935, which examined the eastern extension of Midwestern grasslands.

Transeau spent most of his academic career at Ohio State University, where he served as professor of botany and chaired the department from 1918 to 1946. He was president of the Ecological Society of America and the Botanical Society of America. The standard author abbreviation Transeau is used to indicate his authorship in botanical nomenclature.

Map illustrating the Prairie Peninsula concept introduced by Transeau in 1935.

== Early life and education ==
Transeau was born in Williamsport, Pennsylvania, on October 21, 1875. He earned a bachelor's degree from Franklin & Marshall College in 1897 and later pursued graduate studies at the University of Michigan, where he received his doctorate in 1904. After completing his undergraduate studies, he worked as a secondary school science teacher in Pennsylvania and Colorado.

== Academic career ==
After completing his doctoral studies, Transeau held teaching and research positions at several institutions, including Alma College (1904–1906) and Eastern Illinois Teachers College (1907–1915). He joined the faculty of The Ohio State University in 1915, where he spent the remainder of his academic career.

At Ohio State, Transeau served as professor of botany and chaired the Department of Botany from 1918 to 1946. During his tenure, he played a central role in developing the department's research and teaching programs relating to phycology. Although he did not regularly teach a formal course in algae, he supervised numerous master's and doctoral students whose research focused on freshwater algae. He continued publishing on algal taxonomy and ecology until his retirement in 1946, at which time he was named professor emeritus.

== Research and contributions ==
Transeau made significant contributions to plant ecology, phytogeography, and phycology. His most influential work was the 1935 paper "The Prairie Peninsula" published in Ecology in which he analyzed the eastward extension of Midwestern grasslands and challenged purely climatological explanations for vegetation patterns. The paper helped formalize the concept of the prairie peninsula and became a foundational reference in subsequent studies of North American vegetation.

In the 1935 study, Transeau evaluated competing explanations for the presence of prairie vegetation in Indiana and Ohio. Some ecologists attributed the region's grasslands to poor soil drainage or repeated burning, while others argued that the climate should favor deciduous forest as in surrounding areas. Using climatic data, vegetation boundaries, and glacial history, Transeau argued that no single factor, such as fire or soil conditions, could explain why prairie and forest existed side by side in the region. Instead, he argued that the balance between rainfall and evaporation, particularly during the growing season, helped maintain prairie vegetation over long periods of time.

In addition to his ecological research, Transeau conducted extensive studies of algae, particularly within the family Zygnemataceae. His early publications addressed algal periodicity and hybridization among species, and he described or revised multiple genera within this group. His 1951 monograph The Zygnemataceae, published by The Ohio State University Press, synthesized decades of taxonomic work and became a standard reference for the family. This collection has shown continued use in systematic and taxonomic research, demonstrating its lasting scientific value.

The Zygnemataceae (1951)

== Professional service ==
In addition to his teaching and research, Transeau was active in professional scientific organizations. He served as president of the Ecological Society of America in 1924 and as president of the Botanical Society of America in 1940. He was also president of the Ohio Academy of Sciences in 1924.

== Selected publications ==
- Transeau, E. N. (1935). "The Prairie Peninsula". Ecology, 16(3), 423–437.
- Transeau, E. N. (1940). Textbook of Botany. New York and London: Harper & Brothers.
- Transeau E. N. (1951). The Zygnemataceae. Columbus: Ohio State University Press.

Textbook of Botany (1940)

== Awards and honors ==
Transeau received several honors in recognition of his contributions to botany and ecology. In 1941, he was awarded an honorary doctorate by Franklin & Marshall College. In 1956, he received the Certificate of Merit from the Botanical Society of America. This award is also referred to as the Golden Jubilee Merit Citation.

== Legacy ==
Transeau's research on North American vegetation, particularly his analysis of the prairie peninsula, continued to influence ecological scholarship long after his death. His 1935 study remained a key reference in later discussions of grassland–forest boundaries and regional patterns of plant distribution.

His scientific legacy is also reflected in the continued use of his algal collections in systematic and taxonomic research, particularly studies of the Zygnemataceae, demonstrating the long-term value of his fieldwork and specimen curation. Following his death in 1960, Transeau was commemorated in a Resolution of Respect published by the Ecological Society of America, which summarized his career and contributions to ecology and botanical science. Through his research and mentorship, Transeau helped establish Ohio State as an important center for phycological research in the early twentieth century.
