= Resource (biology) =

Anything required by an organism to survive, grow, and reproduce

In biology and ecology, a resource is a substance or object in the environment required by an organism for normal growth, maintenance, and reproduction. Resources can be consumed by one organism and, as a result, become unavailable to another organism. For plants key resources are light, nutrients, water, and space to grow. For animals key resources are food, water, and territory.

== Key resources for plants ==
Terrestrial plants require particular resources for photosynthesis and to complete their life cycle of germination, growth, reproduction, and dispersal:

- Carbon dioxide
- Microsite (ecology)
- Nutrients
- Pollination
- Seed dispersal
- Soil
- Water

== Key resources for animals ==
Animals require particular resources for metabolism and to complete their life cycle of gestation, birth, growth, and reproduction:

- Foraging
- Territory
- Water

== Resources and ecological processes ==
Resource availability plays a central role in ecological processes:

- Carrying capacity
- Biological competition
- Liebig's law of the minimum
- Niche differentiation

== See also ==
- Abiotic component
- Biotic component
- Community ecology
- Ecology
- Population ecology
- Plant ecology
- size-asymmetric competition
