= Sandra Lavorel =

French ecologist

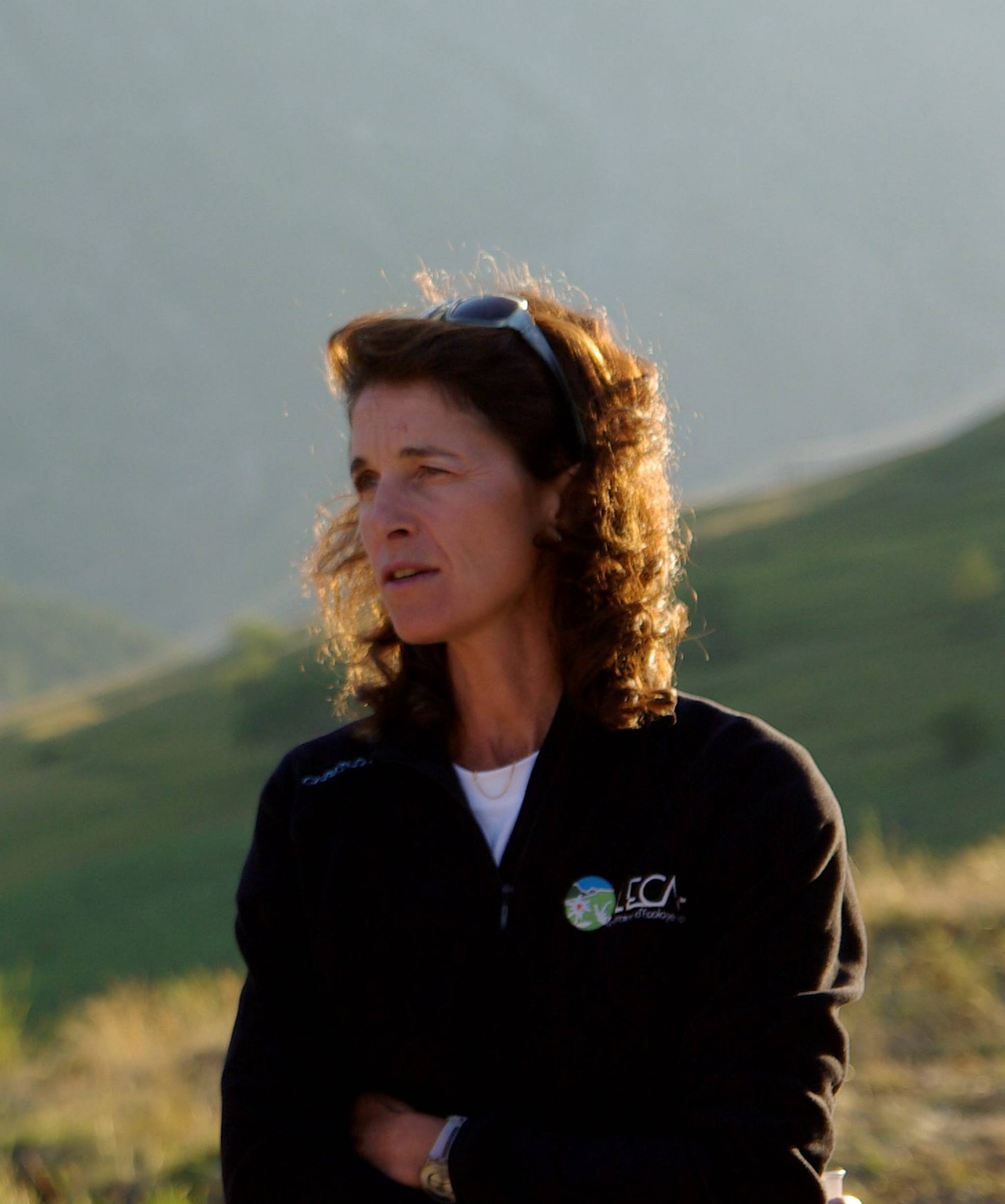
- Born: 1965 (age 60–61); Lyon, France
- Education: Institut national agronomique Paris Grignon; University of Montpellier
- Occupations: Ecologist, research director

Sandra Lavorel (born 1965 in Lyon) is a French ecologist specializing in functional ecology. She is a research director at the French National Centre for Scientific Research (CNRS) where she works at the Alpine Ecology Laboratory in Grenoble, France. She has been a member of the French Academy of sciences since 2013 In 2020, she was honoured to be an international member of the National Academy of Sciences. In 2023, she was the recipient of the CNRS Gold Medal.

== Biography ==
Lavorel graduated as an agricultural engineer from the Institut national agronomique Paris Grignon. She then earned a doctorate in Ecology and Evolutionary Biology from the University of Montpellier in 1991 with a thesis on the mechanisms of coexistence of species in the Mediterranean scrub ecosystem. Her postdoctoral fellowship at the Australian National University, Canberra, Australia where she continued to investigate the mechanisms of species coexistence. In 1994 she returned to France and started working at the French National Center for Scientific Research (CNRS), where she is director of research at the Laboratory of Alpine Ecology (LECA) in Grenoble, France. The LECA is a joint research unit in which researchers from the CNRS, the University of Grenoble Alpes and the Savoy Mont Blanc University can all collaborate.

Lavorel's research is centered around the changes in landscapes and the ways that ecosystems function in response to global changes (climate, land use and biological invasions). The author or coauthor of more than 110 publications, she has recently begun to focus on modeling the numerous benefits that humans derive from ecosystems and their services. Her work has resulted in the development of concepts and methodologies relating to the characteristics of plants which constitute a response to one or more environmental factors – the “functional traits” of plants – and how those traits affect the functioning of the ecosystem.

Lavorel's work has resulted in a research framework for the study of the dynamics of biodiversity and its functional implications. It has also provided a useful guide for other biological models, such as for researchers involved in biodiversity planning and management policies who have found the landscape evolution scenarios that her research has helped to develop.

== Selected works ==
- Cornelissen, J. H. C., S. Lavorel, E. Garnier, S. Díaz, N. Buchmann, D. E. Gurvich, P. B. Reich, H. ter Steege, H. D. Morgan, M. G. A. van der Heijden, J. G. Pausas and H. Poorter (2003). Handbook of protocols for standardised and easy measurement of plant functional traits worldwide. Australian Journal of Botany 51: 335-380.
- Diaz, S., S. Lavorel, F. De Bello, F. Quétier, K. Grigulis and T. M. Robson (2007). Incorporating plant functional diversity effects in ecosystem service assessments. Proceedings of the National Academy of Sciences 104: 20684-20689.
- Díaz, S., S. Lavorel, S. McIntyre, V. Falczuk, F. Casanoves, D. Milchunas, C. Skarpe, G. Rusch, M. Sternberg, I. Noy-Meir, J. Landsberg, W. Zangh, H. Clark and B. D. Campbell (2007). Grazing and plant traits - A global synthesis. Global Change Biology 13: 313-341.
- Grigulis, K., S. Lavorel, U. Krainer, N. Legay, C. Baxendale, M. Dumont, E. Kastl, C. Arnoldi, R. Bardgett, F. Poly, T. Pommier, M. Schloter, U. Tappeiner, M. Bahn and J.-C. Clément (2013). Combined influence of plant and microbial functional traits on ecosystem processes in mountain grasslands. Journal of Ecology 101(1): 47-57.
- Kattge, J., S. Díaz, S. Lavorel, et al. (2011). TRY – a global database of plant traits. Global Change Biology 17(9): 2905-2935.
- Lamarque, P.*, S. Lavorel*, M. Mouchet and F. Quétier (2014). Plant trait-based models identify direct and indirect effects of climate change on bundles of grassland ecosystem services. Proceedings of the National Academy of Sciences 111: 13751–13756. (* shared first authorship)
- Lavorel, S. and E. Garnier (2002). Predicting the effects of environmental changes on plant community composition and ecosystem functioning: revisiting the Holy Grail. Functional Ecology 16: 545-556.
- Lavorel, S., M. Colloff, S. McIntyre, M. Doherty, H. Murphy, D. Metcalfe, M. Dunlop, D. Williams, R. Wise and K. Williams (2015). Ecological mechanisms underpinning climate adaptation services. Global Change Biology 21: 12-31.
- Lavorel, S. and K. Grigulis (2012). How fundamental plant functional trait relationships scale-up to trade-offs and synergies in ecosystem services. Journal of Ecology 100(1): 128-140.
- Lavorel, S., K. Grigulis, P. Lamarque, M.-P. Colace, D. Garden, J. Girel, R. Douzet and G. Pellet (2011). Using plant functional traits to understand the landscape-scale distribution of multiple ecosystem services. Journal of Ecology 99: 135-147.
- Lavorel, S., S. McIntyre, J. Landsberg and D. Forbes (1997). Plant functional classifications: from general groups to specific groups based on response to disturbance. Trends in Ecology and Evolution 12: 474-478.
- Suding, K. N., S. Lavorel, F. S. Chapin III, S. Diaz, E. Garnier, D. Goldberg, D. U. Hooper, S. T. Jackson and M. L. Navas (2008). Scaling environmental change from traits to communities to ecosystems: the challenge of intermediate-level complexity. Global Change Biology 14: 1125-1140.
- Thuiller, W., S. Lavorel, M. B. Araujo, M. T. Sykes and I. C. Prentice (2005). Climate change threats to plant diversity in Europe. Proceedings of the National Academy of Sciences 102: 8245-8250.

== Awards and honours ==
- CNRS Gold Medal (2023)
- BBVA Foundation Frontiers of Knowledge Award for expanding the concept of biodiversity (2020)
- Ramon Margalef Prize in Ecology (2020)
- IAVS Alexander von Humboldt Medal (2015)
- CNRS Silver medal (2013)
- Chevalier of the Ordre national de la Légion d'Honneur (2012)
- CNRS Bronze medal (1998)
