= Community (ecology) =

Associated populations of species in a given area

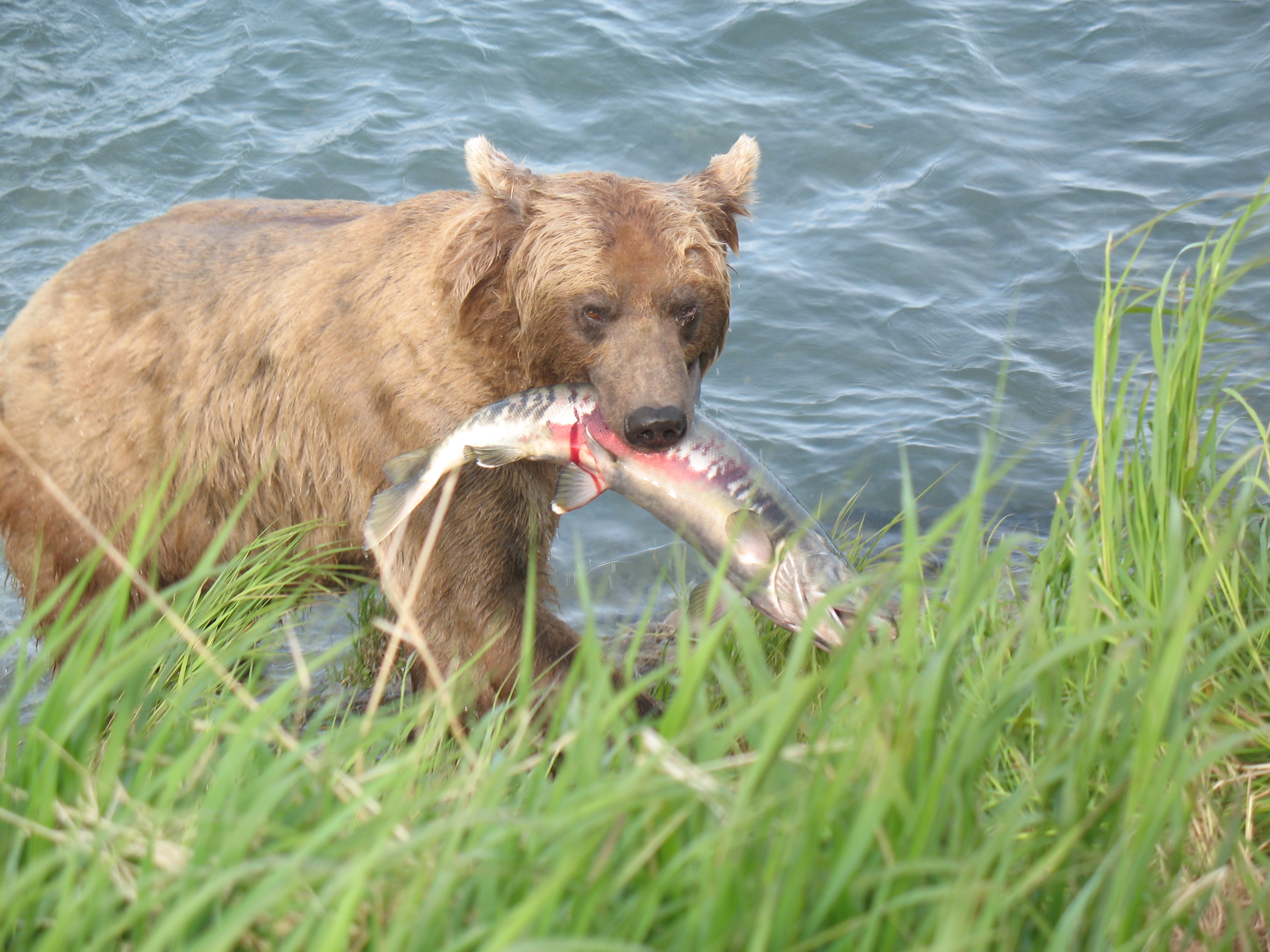
A bear with a salmon. Interspecific interactions such as predation are a key aspect of community ecology.

In ecology, a community is a group or association of populations of multiple species occupying the same geographical area at the same time. The term community has a variety of uses. In its simplest form it refers to groups of organisms in a specific place or time, for example, "the fish community of Lake Ontario before industrialization". Such a grouping is also known as a biocoenosis, biotic community, biological community, ecological community, or life assemblage.

Community ecology or synecology is the study of the interactions between species in communities on many spatial and temporal scales, including the distribution, structure, abundance, demography, and interactions of coexisting populations. The primary focus of community ecology is on the interactions between populations as determined by specific genotypic and phenotypic characteristics. It is important to understand the origin, maintenance, and consequences of species diversity when evaluating community ecology.

Community ecology also takes into account abiotic factors that influence species distributions or interactions (e.g. annual temperature or soil pH). For example, the plant communities inhabiting deserts are very different from those found in tropical rainforests due to differences in annual precipitation. Humans can also affect community structure through habitat disturbance, such as the introduction of invasive species.

On a deeper level the meaning and value of the community concept in ecology is up for debate. Communities have traditionally been understood on a fine scale in terms of local processes constructing (or destructing) an assemblage of species, such as the way climate change is likely to affect the make-up of grass communities. Recently this local community focus has been criticized. Robert Ricklefs, a professor of biology at the University of Missouri and author of Disintegration of the Ecological Community, has argued that it is more useful to think of communities on a regional scale, drawing on evolutionary taxonomy and biogeography, where some species or clades evolve and others go extinct. Today, community ecology focuses on experiments and mathematical models, however, it used to focus primarily on patterns of organisms. For example, taxonomic subdivisions of communities are called populations, while functional partitions are called guilds.

== Organization ==
=== Niche ===
Within the community, each species occupies a niche. A species' niche determines how it interacts with the environment around it and its role within the community. By having different niches species are able to coexist. This is known as niche partitioning. For example, the time of day a species hunts or the prey it hunts.

Niche partitioning reduces competition between species such that species are able to coexist because they suppress their own growth more than they limit the growth of other species (i.e., the competition within a species is greater than the competition between species, or intraspecific competition is greater than interspecific).

The number of niches present in a community determines the number of species present. If two species have the same niche (e.g., the same food demands) then one species outcompetes the other. The more niches filled, the higher the biodiversity of the community.

=== Trophic level ===
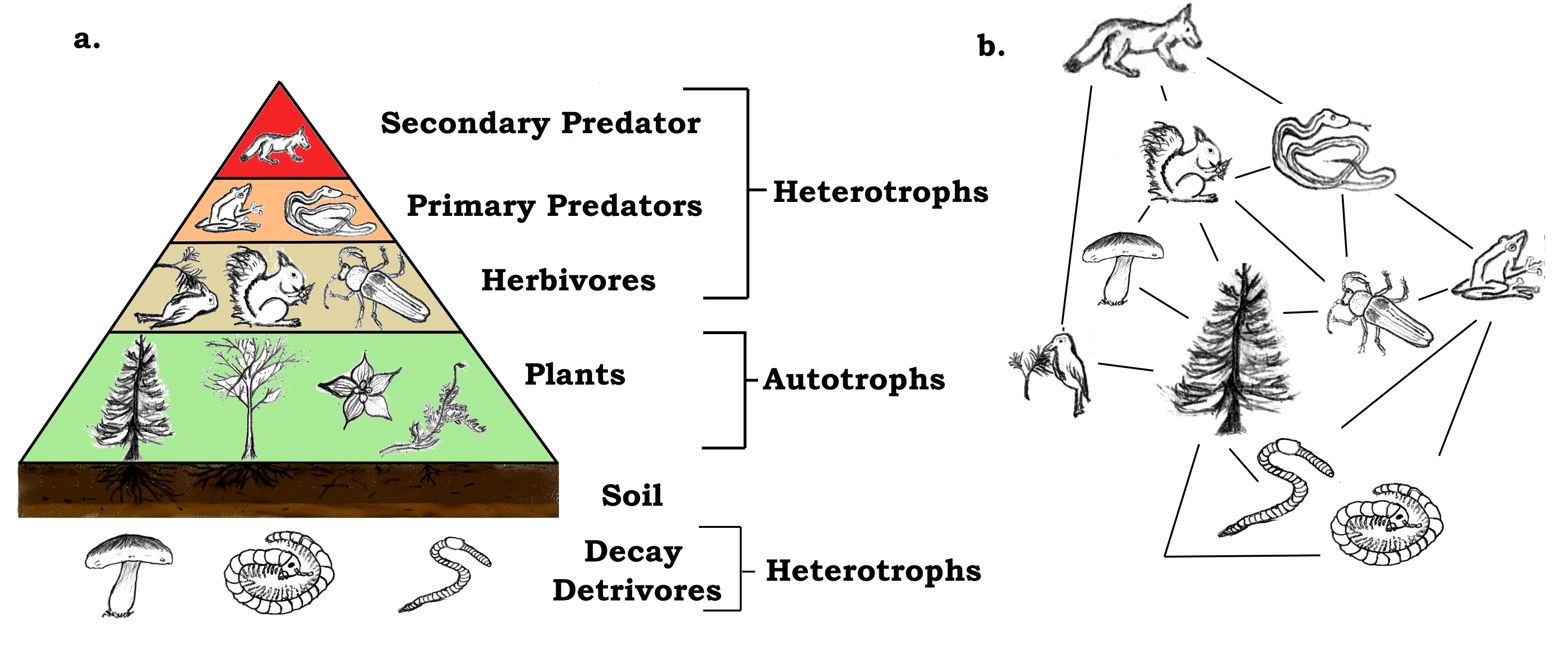
a) A trophic pyramid showing the different trophic levels in a community. b) A food web of the same community

A species' trophic level is their position in the food chain or web. At the bottom of the food web are autotrophs, also known as primary producer. Producers provide their own energy through photosynthesis or chemosynthesis, plants are primary producers. The next level is herbivores (primary consumers), these species feed on vegetation for their energy source. Herbivores are consumed by omnivores or carnivores. These species are secondary and tertiary consumers. Additional levels to the trophic scale come when smaller omnivores or carnivores are eaten by larger ones. At the top of the food web is the apex predator, this animal species is not consumed by any other in the community. Herbivores, omnivores and carnivores are all heterotrophs.

A basic example of a food chain is; grass → rabbit → fox. Food chains become more complex when more species are present, often being food webs. Energy is passed up through trophic levels. Energy is lost at each level, due to ecological inefficiencies.

The trophic level of an organism can change based on the other species present. For example, tuna can be an apex predator eating the smaller fish, such as mackerel. However, in a community where a shark species is present the shark becomes the apex predator, feeding on the tuna.

Decomposers play a role in the trophic pyramid. They provide energy source and nutrients to the plant species in the community. Decomposers such as fungi and bacteria recycle energy back to the base of the food web by feeding on dead organisms from all trophic levels.

=== Guild ===
A guild is a group of species in the community that utilize the same resources in a similar way. Organisms in the same guild experience competition due to their shared resource. Closely related species are often in the same guild, due to traits inherited through common descent from their common ancestor. However, guilds are not exclusively composed of closely related species.

Carnivores, omnivores and herbivores are all basic examples of guilds. A more precise guild would be vertebrates that forage for ground dwelling arthropods, this would contain certain birds and mammals. Flowering plants that have the same pollinator also form a guild.

== Influential species ==
Certain species have a greater influence on the community through their direct and indirect interactions with other species. The population of influential species are affected by abiotic and biotic disturbances. These species are important in identifying communities of ecology. The loss of these species results in large changes to the community, often reducing the stability of the community. Climate change and the introduction of invasive species can affect the functioning of key species and thus have knock-on effects on the community processes. Industrialization and the introduction of chemical pollutants into environments have forever altered communities and even entire ecosystems. The concept of a "living shield" illustrates how mature, undisturbed communities with fully occupied ecological niches exhibit strong biotic resistance to biological invasions. For example, in large river systems, robust populations of native predators can effectively suppress the establishment of invasive fish species, demonstrating that the preservation of ecosystem integrity and native species richness is a primary, cost-effective defense against invasions.

=== Foundation species ===
Foundation species largely influence the population, dynamics and processes of a community, by creating physical changes to the environment itself. These species can occupy any trophic level, but tend to be producers. Red mangrove is a foundation species in marine communities. The mangrove's root provides nursery grounds for young fish, such as snappers.

Whitebark pine (Pinus albicaulis) is a foundation species. Post fire disturbance the tree provides shade (due to its dense growth) enabling the regrowth of other plant species in the community, This growth prompts the return of invertebrates and microbes needed for decomposition. Whitebark pine seeds provide food for grizzly bears.

=== Keystone species ===
A simple trophic cascade diagram. On the right shows when wolves are absent, showing an increase in elks and reduction in vegetation growth. The left one shows when wolves are present and controlling the elk population.

Keystone species have a disproportionate influence on the community than most species. Keystone species tend to be at the higher trophic levels, often being the apex predator. Removal of the keystone species causes top-down trophic cascades. Wolves are keystone species, being an apex predator.

In Yellowstone National Park the loss of the wolf population through overhunting resulted in the loss of biodiversity in the community. The wolves had controlled the number of elks in the park, through predation. Without the wolves the elk population drastically increased, resulting in overgrazing. This negatively affected the other organisms in the park; the increased grazing from the elks removed food sources from other animals present. Wolves have since been reintroduced to return the park community to optimal functioning. See Wolf reintroduction and History of wolves in Yellowstone for more details on this case study.

A marine example of a keystone species is Pisaster ochraceus. This starfish controls the abundance of Mytilus californianus, allowing enough resources for the other species in the community.

=== Ecological engineers ===
An ecosystem engineer is a species that maintains, modifies and creates aspects of a community. They cause physical changes to the habitat and alter the resources available to the other organisms present.

Dam building beavers are ecological engineers. Through the cutting of trees to form dams they alter the flow of water in a community. These changes influence the vegetation on the riparian zone, studies show biodiversity is increased. Burrowing by the beavers creates channels, increasing the connections between habitats. This aids the movement of other organisms in the community such as frogs.

== Theories of community structure ==
Community structure is the composition of the community. It is often measured through biological networks, such as food webs. Food webs are a map showing species networks and the energy that links the species together through trophic interactions.

=== Holistic theory ===
Holistic theory refers to the idea that a community is defined by the interactions between the organisms in it. All species are interdependent, each playing a vital role in the working of the community. Due to this communities are repeatable and easy to identify, with similar abiotic factors controlling throughout.

Frederic Clements developed the holistic (or organismic) concept of community, as if it were a superorganism or discrete unit, with sharp boundaries. Clements proposed this theory after noticing that certain plant species were regularly found together in habitats, he concluded that the species were dependent on each other. Formation of communities is non-random and involves coevolution.

The Holistic theory stems from the greater thinking of Holism—which refers to a system with many parts, all required for the system to function.

=== Individualistic theory ===
Henry Gleason developed the individualistic (also known as open or continuum) concept of community, with the abundance of a population of a species changing gradually along complex environmental gradients. Each species changes independently in relation to other species present along the gradient. Association of species is random and due to coincidence. Varying environmental conditions and each species' probability of arriving and becoming established along the gradient influence the community composition.

Individualistic theory proposes that communities can exist as continuous entities, in addition to the discrete groups referred to in the holistic theory.

=== Neutral theory ===
Stephen P. Hubbell introduced the neutral theory of ecology (not to be confused with the neutral theory of molecular evolution). Within the community (or metacommunity), species are functionally equivalent, and the abundance of a population of a species changes by stochastic demographic processes (i.e., random births and deaths). Equivalence of the species in the community leads to ecological drift. Ecological drift leads to species' populations randomly fluctuating, whilst the overall number of individuals in the community remains constant. When an individual dies, there is an equal chance of each species colonising that plot. Stochastic changes can cause species within the community to go extinct, however, this can take a long time if there are many individuals of that species.

Species can coexist because they are similar, resources and conditions apply a filter to the type of species that are present in the community. Each population has the same adaptive value (competitive and dispersal abilities) and resources demand. Local and regional composition represent a balance between speciation or dispersal (which increase diversity), and random extinctions (which decrease diversity).

== Interspecific interactions ==
Species interact in various ways: competition, predation, parasitism, mutualism, commensalism, etc. The organization of a biological community with respect to ecological interactions is referred to as community structure.

Interactions		Species 1		
Interactions		Negative	Neutral	Positive
Species 2	Negative	Competition	Amensalism	Predation/Parasitism
Species 2	Neutral	Amensalism	Neutralism	Commensalism
Species 2	Positive	Predation/Parasitism	Commensalism	Mutualism

=== Competition ===
Species can compete with each other for finite resources. It is considered an important limiting factor of population size, biomass and species richness. Many types of competition have been described, but proving the existence of these interactions is a matter of debate. Direct competition has been observed between individuals, populations and species, but there is little evidence that competition has been the driving force in the evolution of large groups.

1. Interference competition: occurs when an individual of one species directly interferes with an individual of another species. This can be for food or for territory. Examples include a lion chasing a hyena from a kill, or a plant releasing allelopathic chemicals to impede the growth of a competing species.
2. Apparent competition: occurs when two species share a predator. For example, a cougar preys on woodland caribou and deer. The populations of both species can be depressed by predation without direct exploitative competition.

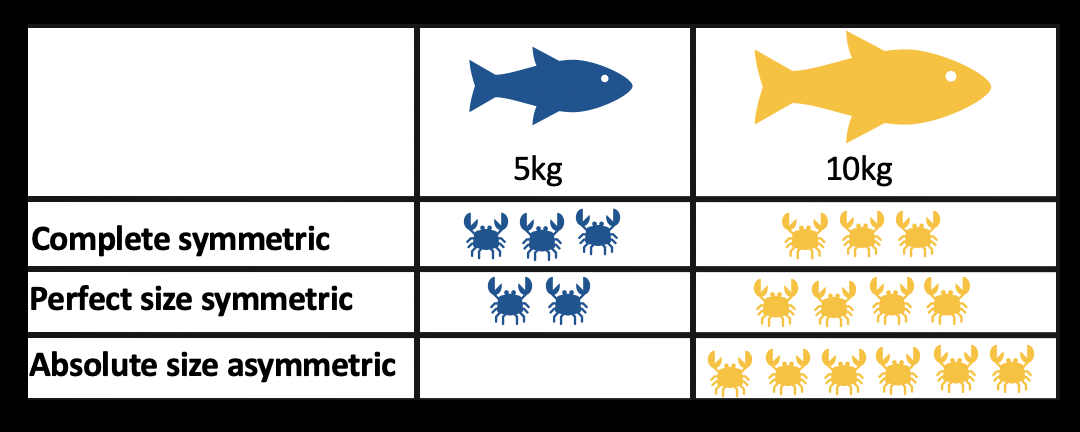
Table visualising size-symmetric competition, using fish as consumers and crabs as resources.

1. Exploitative competition: This occurs via the consumption of resources. When an individual of one species consumes a resource (e.g., food, shelter, sunlight, etc.), that resource is no longer available for consumption by a member of a second species. Exploitative competition is thought to be more common in nature, but care must be taken to distinguish it from the apparent competition. An example of exploitative competition could be between herbivores consuming vegetation; rabbit and deer both eating meadow grass. Exploitative competition varies:

- complete symmetric - all individuals receive the same amount of resources, irrespective of their size
- perfect size symmetric - all individuals exploit the same amount of resource per unit biomass
- absolute size-asymmetric - the largest individuals exploit all the available resource.
The degree of size asymmetry has major effects on the structure and diversity of ecological communities

=== Predation ===
Predation is hunting another species for food. This is a positive-negative interaction, the predator species benefits while the prey species is harmed. Some predators kill their prey before eating them, also known as kill and consume. For example, a hawk catching and killing a mouse. Other predators are parasites that feed on prey while alive, for example, a vampire bat feeding on a cow. Parasitism can however lead to death of the host organism over time. Another example is the feeding on plants of herbivores, for example, a cow grazing. Herbivory is a type of predation in which a plant (the prey in this example) will attempt to dissuade the predator from eating the plant by pumping a toxin to the plant leaves. This may cause the predator to consume other areas of the plant or not consume the plant at all. Predation may affect the population size of predators and prey and the number of species coexisting in a community.

Predation can be specialist, for example the least weasel predates solely on the field vole. Or generalist, e.g. polar bear primarily eats seals but can switch diet to birds when seal population is low.

Species can be solitary or group predators. The advantage of hunting in a group means bigger prey can be taken, however, the food source must be shared. Wolves are group predators, whilst tigers are solitary.

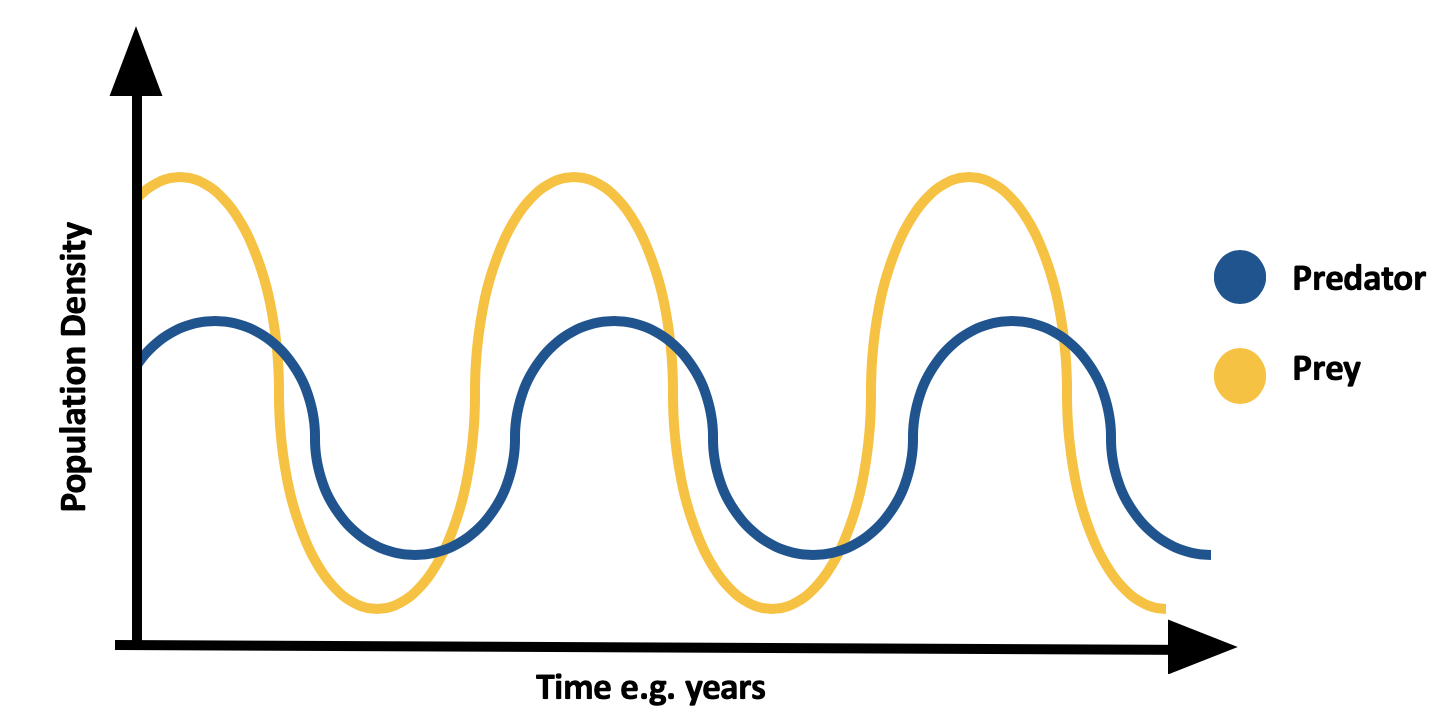
A generalised graph of a predator-prey population density cycle

Predation is density dependant, often leading to population cycles. When prey is abundant predator species increases, thus eating more prey species and causing the prey population to decline. Due to lack of food the predator population declines. Due to lack of predation the prey population increases. See Lotka–Volterra equations for more details on this. A well-known example of this is lynx-hare population cycles seen in the north.

Predation can result in coevolution – evolutionary arms race, prey adapts to avoid predator, predator evolves. For example, a prey species develops a toxin that kills its predator and the predator evolves resistance to the toxin making it no longer lethal.

=== Mutualism ===
Mutualism is an interaction between species in which both species benefit.

An example is Rhizobium bacteria growing in nodules on the roots of legumes. This relationship between plant and bacteria is endosymbiotic, the bacteria living on the roots of the legume. The plant provides compounds made during photosynthesis to the bacteria, that can be used as an energy source. Whilst Rhizobium is a nitrogen fixing bacteria, providing amino acids or ammonium to the plant.

Insects pollinating the flowers of angiosperms, is another example. Many plants are dependent on pollination from a pollinator. A pollinator transfers pollen from the male flower to the female's stigma. This fertilises the flower and enables the plant to reproduce. Bees, such as honeybees, are the most commonly known pollinators. Bees get nectar from the plant that they use as an energy source. Un-transferred pollen provides protein for the bee. The plant benefits through fertilisation, whilst the bee is provided with food.

=== Commensalism ===
Commensalism is a type of relationship among organisms in which one organism benefits while the other organism is neither benefited nor harmed. The organism that benefited is called the commensal while the other organism that is neither benefited nor harmed is called the host.

For example, an epiphytic orchid attached to the tree for support benefits the orchid but neither harms nor benefits the tree. This type of commensalism is called inquilinism, the orchid permanently lives on the tree.

Phoresy is another type of commensalism, the commensal uses the host solely for transport. Many mite species rely on another organism, such as birds or mammals, for dispersal.

Metabiosis is the final form of commensalism. The commensal relies on the host to prepare an environment suitable for life. For example, kelp has a root like system, called a holdfast, that attaches it to the seabed. Once rooted it provides molluscs, such as sea snails, with a home that protects them from predation.

=== Amensalism ===
The opposite of commensalism is amensalism, an interspecific relationship in which a product of one organism has a negative effect on another organism but the original organism is unaffected.

An example is an interaction between tadpoles of the common frog and a freshwater snail. The tadpoles consume large amounts of micro-algae. Making algae less abundant for the snail, the algae available for the snail is also of lower quality. The tadpole, therefore, has a negative effect on the snail without a gaining noticeable advantage from the snail. The tadpoles would obtain the same amount of food with or without the presence of the snail.

An older, taller tree can inhibit the growth of smaller trees. A new sapling growing in the shade of a mature tree struggles to get light for photosynthesis. The mature tree also has a well-developed root system, helping it outcompete the sapling for nutrients. Growth of the sapling is therefore impeded, often resulting in death. The relationship between the two trees is amensalism, the mature tree is unaffected by the presence of the smaller one.

=== Parasitism ===
Parasitism is an interaction in which one organism, the host, is harmed while the other, the parasite, benefits.

Parasitism is a symbiosis, a long-term bond in which the parasite feeds on the host or takes resources from the host. Parasites can live within the body such as a tapeworm. Or on the body's surface, for example head-lice.

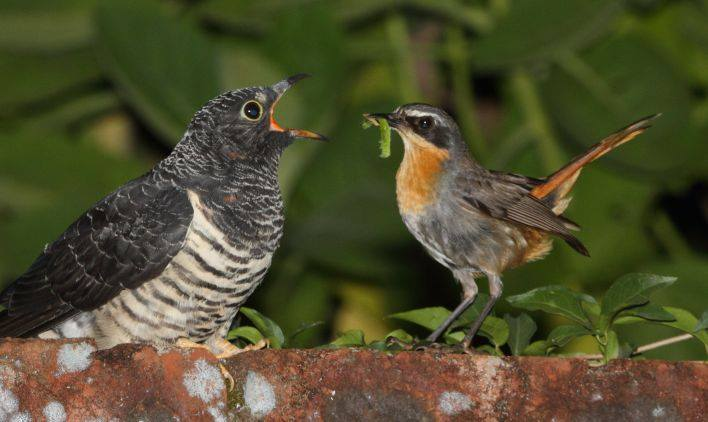
A red-chested cuckoo chick being fed by a significantly smaller Cape robin-chat adult

Malaria is a result of a parasitic relationship between a female Anopheles mosquito and Plasmodium. Mosquitos get the parasite by feeding on an infected vertebrate. Inside the mosquito the plasmodium develops in the midgut's wall. Once developed to a zygote the parasite moves to the salivary glands where it can be passed on to a vertebrate species, for example humans. The mosquito acts as a vector for Malaria. The parasite tends to reduce the mosquito's lifespan and inhibits the production of offspring.

A second example of parasitism is brood parasitism. Cuckoos regularly do this type of parasitism. Cuckoos lay their eggs in the nest of another species of birds. The host, therefore, provides for the cuckoo chick as if it were as their own, unable to tell the difference. The cuckoo chicks eject the host's young from the nest meaning they get a greater level of care and resources from the parents. Rearing for young is costly and can reduce the success of future offspring, thus the cuckoo attempts to avoid this cost through brood parasitism.

In a similar way to predation, parasitism can lead to an evolutionary arms race. The host evolves to protect themselves from the parasite and the parasite evolves to overcome this restriction.

=== Neutralism ===
Neutralism is where species interact, but the interaction has no noticeable effects on either species involved. Due to the interconnectedness of communities, true neutralism is rare. Examples of neutralism in ecological systems are hard to prove, due to the indirect effects that species can have on each other.

== See also ==
- Biocoenosis – Interacting organisms living together in a habitat
- Co-evolution – Two or more species influencing each other's evolution
- Community structure – Concept in graph theory
- Convergent evolution – Independent evolution of similar features
- Coexistence theory – Framework explaining how competitor traits can maintain species diversity
- Deep sea community – Groups of organisms living deep below the sea surface, sharing a habitat
- Ecological effects of biodiversity
- Evolutionary radiation – Increase in taxonomic diversity or morphological disparity
- Limiting similarity – Concept in theoretical ecology and community ecology
- Metacommunity – Group of communities in ecology
- Population ecology – Field of ecology
- Phage community ecology – Interaction of bacteriophages with their environments
- Phylogeography – Subfield of genealogy
- Phytocoenosis – Empirical study of plant growth in communities
- Plant community – Collection of native photosynthetic organisms
- Scientific classification – Development of classes and classifications
- size-asymmetric competition
- R* rule – Hypothesis about plant resource use competition in community ecology
- CSR theory – Theoretical ecology
- Guild (ecology) – Group of sympatric species with similar ecological function
