= R* rule (ecology) =

Hypothesis about plant resource use competition in community ecology

The R* rule (also called the resource-ratio hypothesis) is a hypothesis in community ecology that attempts to predict which species will become dominant as the result of competition for resources. The hypothesis was formulated by American ecologist David Tilman. It predicts that if multiple species are competing for a single limiting resource, then whichever species can survive at the lowest equilibrium resource level (i.e., the R*) can outcompete all other species. If two species are competing for two resources, then coexistence is only possible if each species has a lower R* on one of the resources. For example, two phytoplankton species may be able to coexist if one is more limited by nitrogen, and the other is more limited by phosphorus.

A large number of experimental studies have attempted to verify the predictions of the R* rule. Many studies have shown that when multiple plankton are grown together, the species with the lowest R* will dominate, or coexist if they are limited by multiple resources. There are fewer tests of the R* rule in communities of larger organisms, in part because of the difficulty of creating a situation in which only a single resource is limiting. However, some studies have used the R* rule with multiple resources to predict which groups of plants will be able to coexist.

== Mathematical derivation ==
Consider a community with multiple species. We will assume that each species competes for a single resource, and ignore the effects of interference or apparent competition. Each population increases by consuming resources, and declines when resources are too scarce. For example, we could model their population dynamics as

$\frac{dN_j}{dt} = N_j(a_j R - d)$

$\frac{dR}{dt} = r - R\sum_j a_jN_j$

where N_{j} is the density of species j, R is the density of the resource, a is the rate at which species j eats the resource, d is species js death rate, and r is the rate at which resources grow when not consumed. It is easy to show that when species j is at equilibrium by itself (i.e., dN_{j}/dt = 0), that the equilibrium resource density, R*_{j}, is

$R^*_j = d/a_j.$

When R > R*_{j}, species j's population will increase; when R is less than R*_{j}, species js population will decline. Because of this, the species with the lowest R* will eventually dominate. Consider the two species case, where R*_{1} < R*_{2}. When species 2 is at equilibrium, R = R*_{2}, and species 1's population will be increasing. When species 1 is at equilibrium, R = R*_{1}, and species 2's population will be decreasing.

This method has been extended to analyze more complex models, such as species with a Type II functional response. Under many additional circumstances, the above result still holds: the species who can survive at the lowest resource levels will be the competitive dominant.

== Relation to the CSR triangle theory ==
Understanding the differences between the R* theory and its major alternative the CSR triangle theory is a major goal in community ecology for many years. Unlike the R* theory, the CSR theory predicts that competitive ability is determined by relative growth rate and other size related traits. While some experiments supported the R* predictions, other supported the CSR predictions. The different predictions stem from different assumptions on the size asymmetry of the competition. The R* theory assumes that competition is size symmetric (i.e. resource exploitation is proportional to individual biomass), the CSR theory assumes that competition is size-asymmetric (i.e. large individuals exploit disproportional higher amounts of resources compared with smaller individuals).
