= Plant ecology =

Study of effect of the environment on the abundance and distribution of plants

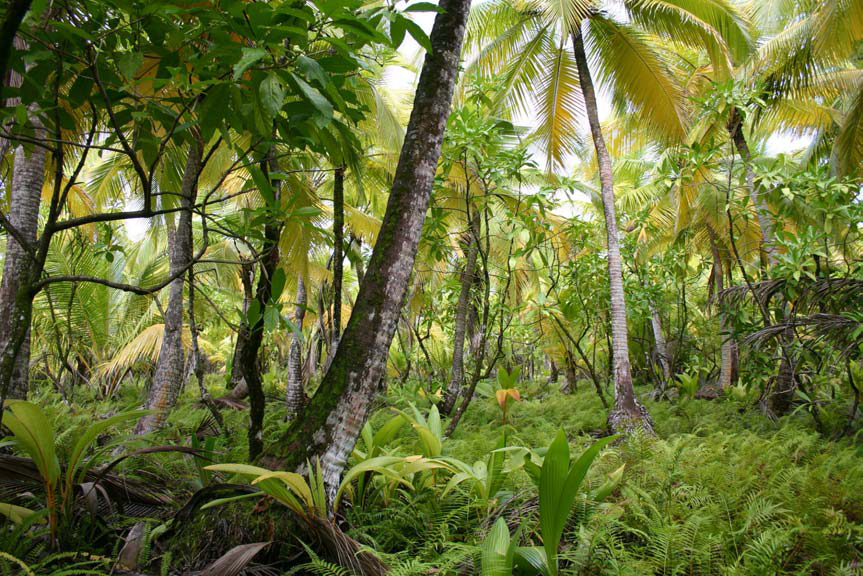
A tropical plant community on Diego Garcia

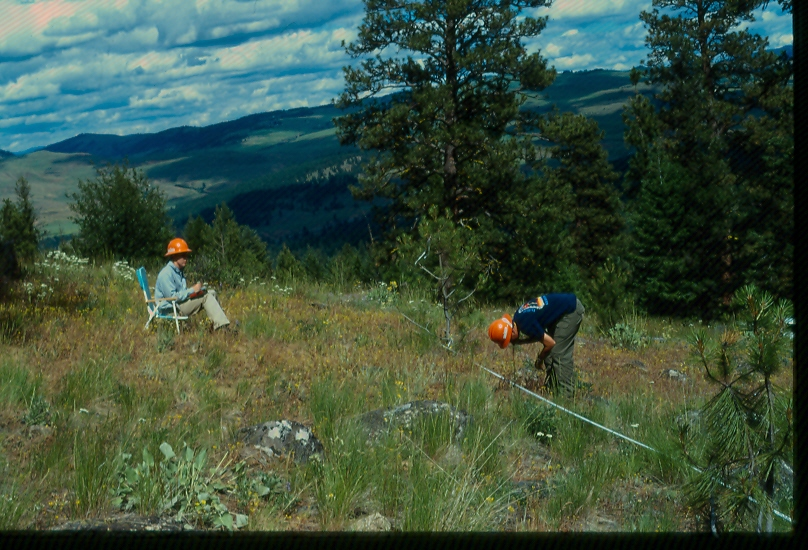
Rangeland monitoring using Parker 3-step Method, Okanagan Washington 2002

Plant ecology is a subdiscipline of ecology that studies the distribution and abundance of plants, the effects of environmental factors upon the abundance of plants, and the interactions among plants and between plants and other organisms. Examples of these are the distribution of temperate deciduous forests in North America, the effects of drought or flooding upon plant survival, and competition among desert plants for water, or effects of herds of grazing animals upon the composition of grasslands.

A global overview of the Earth's major vegetation types is provided by O.W. Archibold. He recognizes 11 major vegetation types: tropical forests, tropical savannas, arid regions (deserts), Mediterranean ecosystems, temperate forest ecosystems, temperate grasslands, coniferous forests, tundra (both polar and high mountain), terrestrial wetlands, freshwater ecosystems and coastal/marine systems. This breadth of topics shows the complexity of plant ecology, since it includes plants from floating single-celled algae up to large canopy forming trees.

One feature that defines plants is photosynthesis. Photosynthesis is the process of chemical reactions to create glucose and oxygen, which is vital for plant life, starting at the leaf of the plant. One of the most important aspects of plant ecology is the role plants have played in creating the oxygenated atmosphere of earth, an event that occurred some 2 billion years ago. It can be dated by the deposition of banded iron formations, distinctive sedimentary rocks with large amounts of iron oxide. At the same time, plants began removing carbon dioxide from the atmosphere, thereby initiating the process of controlling Earth's climate. A long term trend of the Earth has been toward increasing oxygen and decreasing carbon dioxide, and many other events in the Earth's history, like the first movement of life onto land, are likely tied to this sequence of events.

One of the early classic books on plant ecology was written by J.E. Weaver and F.E. Clements. It talks broadly about plant communities, and particularly the importance of forces like competition and processes like succession. The term ecology itself was coined by German biologist Ernst Haeckel.

Plant ecology can also be divided by levels of organization including plant ecophysiology, plant population ecology, community ecology, ecosystem ecology, landscape ecology and biosphere ecology.

First, most plants are rooted in the soil, which makes it difficult to observe and measure nutrient uptake and species interactions. Second, plants often reproduce vegetatively, that is asexually, in a way that makes it difficult to distinguish individual plants. Indeed, the very concept of an individual is doubtful, since even a tree may be regarded as a large collection of linked meristems. Hence, plant ecology and animal ecology have different styles of approach to problems that involve processes like reproduction, dispersal and mutualism. Some plant ecologists have placed considerable emphasis upon trying to treat plant populations as if they were animal populations, focusing on population ecology. Many other ecologists believe that while it is useful to draw upon population ecology to solve certain scientific problems, plants demand that ecologists work with multiple perspectives, appropriate to the problem, the scale and the situation.

== History ==
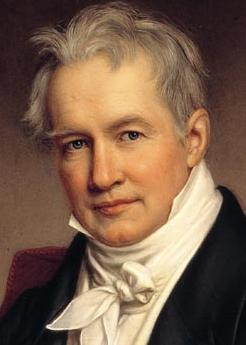
Alexander von Humboldt's work connecting plant distributions with environmental factors played an important role in the genesis of the discipline of plant ecology.

Plant ecology has its origin in the application of plant physiology to the questions raised by plant geographers. Carl Ludwig Willdenow was one of the first to note that similar climates produced similar types of vegetation, even when they were located in different parts of the world. Willdenow's student, Alexander von Humboldt, used physiognomy to describe vegetation types and observed that the distribution vegetation types was based on environmental factors. Later plant geographers who built upon Humboldt's work included Joakim Frederik Schouw, A.P. de Candolle, August Grisebach and Anton Kerner von Marilaun. Schouw's work, published in 1822, linked plant distributions to environmental factors (especially temperature) and established the practice of naming plant associations by adding the suffix -etum to the name of the dominant species. Working from herbarium collections, De Candolle searched for general rules of plant distribution and settled on using temperature as well. Grisebach's two-volume work, Die Vegetation der Erde nach Ihrer Klimatischen Anordnung, published in 1872, saw plant geography reach its "ultimate form" as a descriptive field.

Starting in the 1870s, Swiss botanist Simon Schwendener, together with his students and colleagues, established the link between plant morphology and physiological adaptations, laying the groundwork for the first ecology textbooks, Eugenius Warming's Plantesamfund (published in 1895) and Andreas Schimper's 1898 Pflanzengeographie auf Physiologischer Grundlage. Warming successfully incorporated plant morphology, physiology taxonomy and biogeography into plant geography to create the field of plant ecology. Although more morphological than physiological, Schimper's has been considered the beginning of plant physiological ecology. Plant ecology was initially built around static ideas of plant distribution; incorporating the concept of succession added an element to change through time to the field. Henry Chandler Cowles' studies of plant succession on the Lake Michigan sand dunes (published in 1899) and Frederic Clements' 1916 monograph on the subject established it as a key element of plant ecology.

Plant ecology developed within the wider discipline of ecology over the twentieth century. Inspired by Warming's Plantesamfund, Arthur Tansley set out to map British plant communities. In 1904 he teamed up with William Gardner Smith and others involved in vegetation mapping to establish the Central Committee for the Survey and Study of British Vegetation, later shortened to British Vegetation Committee. In 1913, the British Vegetation Committee organised the British Ecological Society (BES), the first professional society of ecologists. This was followed in 1917 by the establishment of the Ecological Society of America (ESA); plant ecologists formed the largest subgroup among the inaugural members of the ESA.

Cowles' students played an important role in the development of the field of plant ecology during the first half of the twentieth century, among them William S. Cooper, E. Lucy Braun and Edgar Transeau.

Graphical timeline of plant ecologists

== Distribution ==
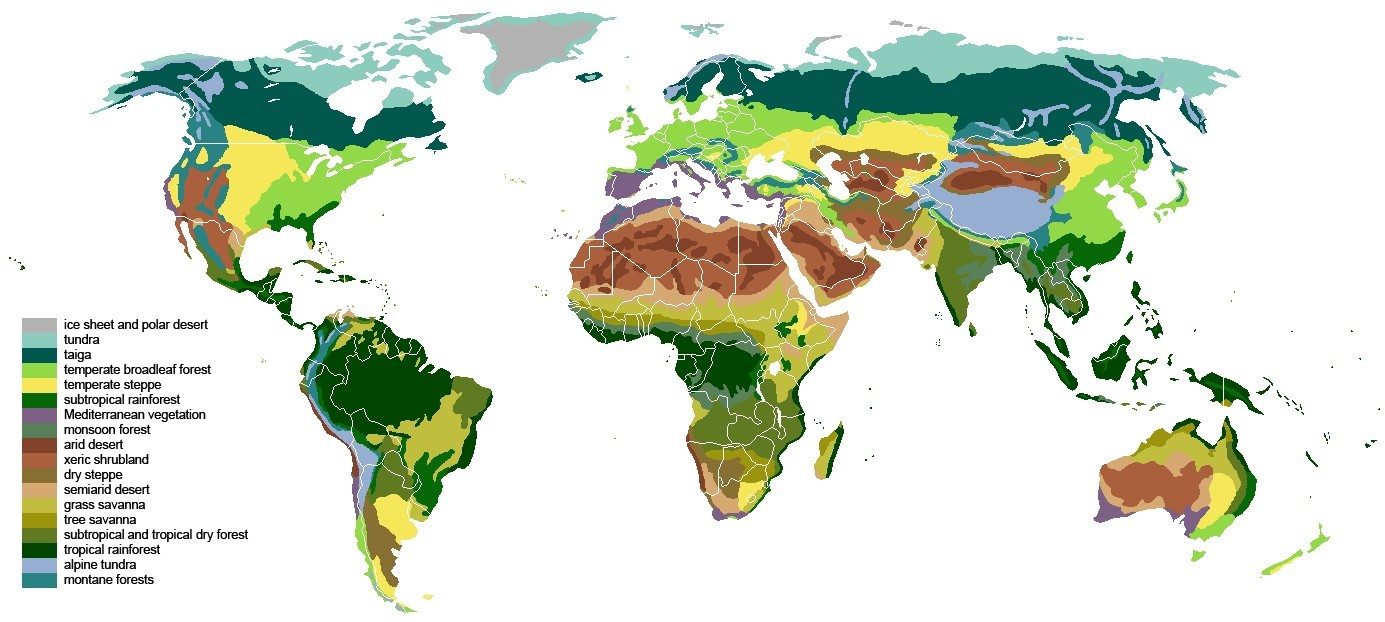
World biomes are based upon the type of dominant plant.

Plant distributions is governed by a combination of historical factors, ecophysiology and biotic interactions. The set of species that can be present at a given site is limited by historical contingency. In order to show up, a species must either have evolved in an area or dispersed there (either naturally or through human agency, many species, particularly invasive plants are spread through activities such as horticulture, transport, and land use change), and must not have gone locally extinct. The set of species present locally is further limited to those that possess the physiological adaptations to survive the environmental conditions that exist. This group is further shaped through interactions with other species.

Plant communities are broadly distributed into biomes based on the form of the dominant plant species. For example, grasslands are dominated by grasses, while forests are dominated by trees. Biomes are determined by regional climates, mostly temperature and precipitation, and follow general latitudinal trends. Within biomes, there may be many ecological communities, which are impacted not only by climate and a variety of smaller-scale features, including soils, hydrology, and disturbance regime. Biomes also change with elevation, high elevations often resembling those found at higher latitudes.

== Biological interactions ==
=== Competition ===
Plants, like most life forms, require relatively few basic elements: carbon, hydrogen, oxygen, nitrogen, phosphorus and sulphur; hence they are known as CHNOPS life forms. There are also lesser elements needed as well, frequently termed micronutrients, such as magnesium and sodium. When plants grow in close proximity, they may deplete supplies of these elements and have a negative impact upon neighbours. Competition for resources vary from complete symmetric (all individuals receive the same amount of resources, irrespective of their size) to perfectly size symmetric (all individuals exploit the same amount of resource per unit biomass) to absolutely size-asymmetric (the largest individuals exploit all the available resource). The degree of size asymmetry has major effects on the structure and diversity of ecological communities. In many cases (perhaps most) the negative effects upon neighbours arise from size asymmetric competition for light. In other cases, there may be competition below ground for water, nitrogen, or phosphorus. To detect and measure competition, experiments are necessary; these experiments require removing neighbours, and measuring responses in the remaining plants. Many such studies are required before useful generalizations can be drawn. Early experimental studies demonstrated that competition between plant species can vary depending on environmental conditions such as soil type, influencing species distribution and community structure.

Overall, it appears that light is the most important resource for which plants compete, and the increase in plant height over evolutionary time likely reflects selection for taller plants to better intercept light. Many plant communities are therefore organized into hierarchies based upon the relative competitive abilities for light. In some systems, particularly infertile or arid systems, below ground competition may be more significant. Along natural gradients of soil fertility, it is likely that the ratio of above ground to below ground competition changes, with higher above ground competition in the more fertile soils. Plants that are relatively weak competitors may escape in time (by surviving as buried seeds) or in space (by dispersing to a new location away from strong competitors).

In principle, it is possible to examine competition at the level of the limiting resources if a detailed knowledge of the physiological processes of the competing plants is available. However, in most terrestrial ecological studies, there is only little information on the uptake and dynamics of the resources that limit the growth of different plant species, and, instead, competition is inferred from observed negative effects of neighbouring plants without knowing precisely which resources the plants were competing for. In certain situations, plants may compete for a single growth-limiting resource, perhaps for light in agricultural systems with sufficient water and nutrients, or in dense stands of marsh vegetation, but in many natural ecosystems plants may be colimited by several resources, e.g. light, phosphorus and nitrogen at the same time.

Therefore, there are many details that remain to be uncovered, particularly the kinds of competition that arise in natural plant communities, the specific resource(s), the relative importance of different resources, and the role of other factors like stress or disturbance in regulating the importance of competition.

=== Mutualism ===
Mutualism is defined as an interaction "between two species or individuals that is beneficial to both". Probably the most widespread example in plants is the mutual beneficial relationship between plants and fungi, known as mycorrhizae. The plant is assisted with nutrient uptake (mainly phosphate), while the fungus receives carbohydrates. Some the earliest known fossil plants even have fossil mycorrhizae on their rhizomes.

The flowering plants are a group that have evolved by using two major mutualisms. First, flowers are pollinated by insects. This relationship seems to have its origins in beetles feeding on primitive flowers, eating pollen and also acting (unwittingly) as pollinators. Second, fruits are eaten by animals, and the animals then disperse the seeds. Thus, the flowering plants actually have three major types of mutualism, since most higher plants also have mycorrhizae.

Plants may also have beneficial effects upon one another, but this is less common. Examples might include "nurse plants" whose shade allows young cacti to establish. Most examples of mutualism, however, are largely beneficial to only one of the partners, and may not really be true mutualism. The term used for these more one-sided relationships, which are mostly beneficial to one participant, is facilitation. Facilitation among neighboring plants may act by reducing the negative impacts of a stressful environment. In general, facilitation is more likely to occur in physically stressful environments than in favorable environments, where competition may be the most important interaction among species.

Commensalism is similar to facilitation, in that one plant is mostly exploiting another. A familiar example is the epiphytes which grow on branches of tropical trees, or even mosses which grow on trees in deciduous forests.

It is important to keep track of the benefits received by each species to determine the appropriate term. Although people are often fascinated by unusual examples, it is important to remember that in plants, the main mutualisms are mycorrhizae, pollination, and seed dispersal.

=== Parasitism ===
Parasitism in biology refers to an interaction between different species, where the parasite (one species) benefits at the expense of the host (the other species). Parasites depend on another organism (their host) for survival in general, which usually includes both habitat and nutrient requirements at the very minimum. Parasitic plants attach themselves to host plants via a haustoria to the xylem and/or phloem. Many parasitic plants are generalists and are able to attack multiple hosts at the same time, greatly affecting community structures. Host species' growth, reproduction, and metabolism are affected by the parasite due to the nutrients, water, and carbon being taken by the parasite. They are also able to alter competitive interactions among hosts and indirectly affect competition in the community.

=== Commensalism ===
Commensalism refers to the biological interaction between two species in which one benefits while the other simply remains unaffected. The species that benefits is referred to as the commensal while the species that is unaffected is referred to as the host. For example, organisms that live attached to plants, known as epiphytes, are referred to as commensals. Algae that grow on the backs of turtles or sloths are also considered as commensals. Their survival rate is higher when they are attached to their host, however they do not harm or benefit the host. Nearly 10% of all vascular plant species around the world are epiphytes, and most of them are found in tropical forests; they make up 25% of all vascular plant species in tropical countries. However, commensals have the capability to transform into parasites over time, which results in a decrease in success or an overall population decline.

=== Herbivory ===
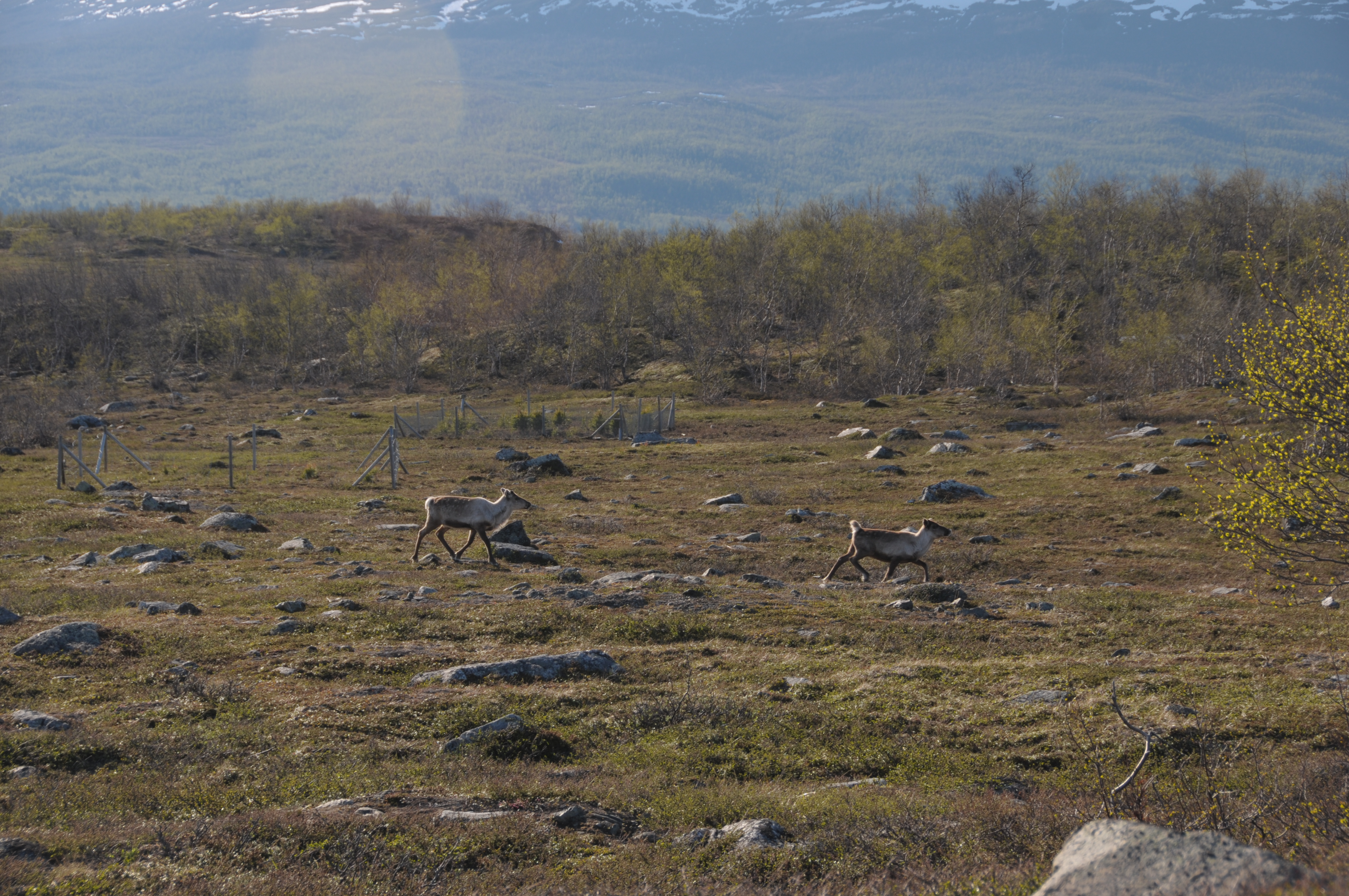
Reindeer in front of herbivore exclosures. Excluding different herbivores (here reindeer, or reindeer and rodents) has different effects on the vegetation.

An important ecological function of plants is that they produce organic compounds for herbivores in the bottom of the food web. A large number of plant traits, from thorns to chemical defenses, can be related to the intensity of herbivory. Large herbivores can also have many effects on vegetation. These include removing selected species, creating gaps for regeneration of new individuals, recycling nutrients, and dispersing seeds. Certain ecosystem types, such as grasslands, may be dominated by the effects of large herbivores, although fire is also an equally important factor in this biome. In few cases, herbivores are capable of nearly removing all the vegetation at a site (for example, geese in the Hudson Bay Lowlands of Canada, and nutria in the marshes of Louisiana) but normally herbivores have a more selective impact, particularly when large predators control the abundance of herbivores. Another example is white-tailed deer in Canadian forests, where high browsing pressure has been shown to limit forest regeneration and alter plant community composition by reducing that recruitment of tree seedlings and sapling. The usual method of studying the effects of herbivores is to build exclosures, where they cannot feed, and compare the plant communities in the exclosures to those outside over many years. Often such long term experiments show that herbivores have a significant effect upon the species that make up the plant community. In some systems, understory plants such as Trillium grandiflorum are used as indicator species to estimate herbivory pressure, as their growth and height reflect local browsing intensity.

== Other topics ==
=== Abundance ===
The ecological success of a plant species in a specific environment may be quantified by its abundance, and depending on the life form of the plant different measures of abundance may be relevant, e.g. density, biomass, or plant cover.

The change in the abundance of a plant species may be due to both abiotic factors, e.g. climate change, or biotic factors, e.g. herbivory or interspecific competition.

=== Colonisation and local extinction ===
Whether a plant species is present at a local area depends on the processes of colonisation and local extinction. The probability of colonisation decreases with distance to neighboring habitats where the species is present and increases with plant abundance and fecundity in neighboring habitats and the dispersal distance of the species. The probability of local extinction decreases with abundance (both living plants and seeds in the soil seed bank).

=== Reproduction ===
There are a few ways that reproduction occurs within plant life, and one way is through parthenogenesis. Parthenogenesis is defined as "a form of asexual reproduction in which genetically identical offspring (clones) are produced." Another form of reproduction is through cross-fertilization, which is defined as "fertilization in which the egg and sperm are produced by different individuals," and in plants this occurs in the ovule. Once an ovule is fertilized within the plant this becomes what is known as a seed. A seed normally contains the nutritive tissue also known as the endosperm and the embryo. A seedling is a young plant that has recently gone through germination. Another form of reproduction of a plant is self-fertilization; in which both the sperm and the egg are produced from the same individual- this plant is therefore a self-compatible titled plant.

== See also ==
- Biogeochemistry
- Community ecology
- Forest ecology
- CSR theory
- Landscape ecology
- R* rule
- Size-asymmetric competition
- Systems ecology
- Vegetation
