= Competition (biology) =

Type of species interaction

A great egret and neotropic cormorant competing over territory

Competition is an interaction between organisms or species in which both require one or more resources that are in limited supply (such as food, water, or territory). Competition lowers the fitness of both organisms involved since the presence of one of the organisms always reduces the amount of the resource available to the other.

In the study of community ecology, competition within and between members of a species is an important biological interaction. Competition is one of many interacting biotic and abiotic factors that affect community structure, species diversity, and population dynamics (shifts in a population over time).

There are three major mechanisms of competition: interference, exploitation, and apparent competition (in order from most direct to least direct). Interference and exploitation competition can be classed as "real" forms of competition, while apparent competition is not, as organisms do not share a resource, but instead share a predator. Competition among members of the same species is known as intraspecific competition, while competition between individuals of different species is known as interspecific competition.

According to the competitive exclusion principle, species less suited to compete for resources must either adapt or die out, although competitive exclusion is rarely found in natural ecosystems. According to evolutionary theory, competition within and between species for resources is important in natural selection. More recently, however, researchers have suggested that evolutionary biodiversity for vertebrates has been driven not by competition between organisms, but by these animals adapting to colonize empty livable space; this is termed the 'Room to Roam' hypothesis.

== Interference competition ==
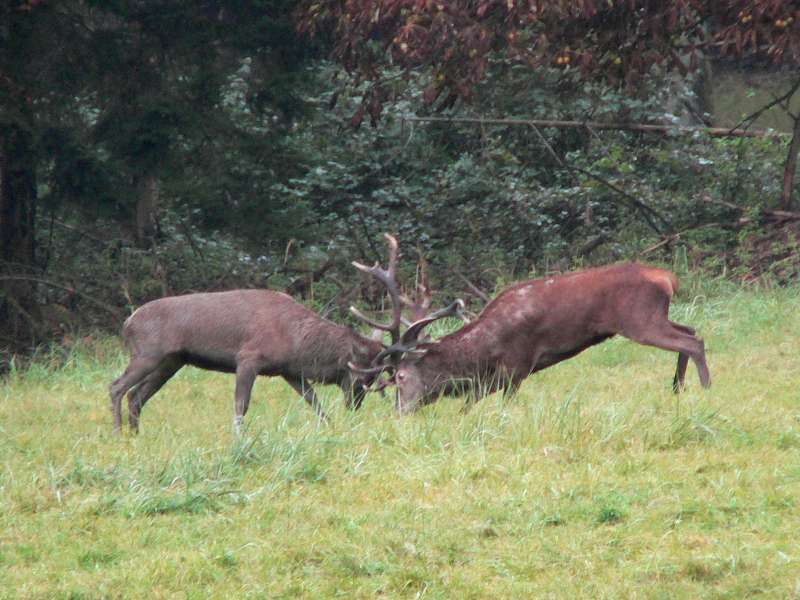
Male-male competition in red deer during rut is an example of interference competition within a species.

During interference competition, also called contest competition, organisms interact directly by fighting for scarce resources. For example, large aphids defend feeding sites on cottonwood leaves by ejecting smaller aphids from better sites. Male-male competition in red deer during rut is an example of interference competition that occurs within a species.

Interference competition occurs directly between individuals via aggression when the individuals interfere with the foraging, survival, and reproduction of others, or by directly preventing their physical establishment in a portion of the habitat. An example of this can be seen between the ant Novomessor cockerelli and red harvester ants, where the former interferes with the ability of the latter to forage by plugging the entrances to their colonies with small rocks. Male bowerbirds, who create elaborate structures called bowers to attract potential mates, may reduce the fitness of their neighbors directly by stealing decorations from their structures.

In animals, interference competition is a strategy mainly adopted by larger and stronger organisms within a habitat. As such, populations with high interference competition have adult-driven generation cycles. At first, the growth of juveniles is stunted by larger adult competitors. However, once the juveniles reach adulthood, they experience a secondary growth cycle. Plants, on the other hand, primarily engage in interference competition with their neighbors through allelopathy, or the production of biochemicals.

Interference competition can be seen as a strategy that has a clear cost (injury or death) and benefit (obtaining resources that would have gone to other organisms). In order to cope with strong interference competition, other organisms often either do the same or engage in exploitation competition. For example, depending on the season, larger ungulate red deer males are competitively dominant due to interference competition. However, does and fawns have dealt with this through temporal resource partitioning — foraging for food only when adult males are not present.

== Exploitation competition ==
Exploitation competition, or scramble competition, occurs indirectly when organisms both use a common limiting resource or shared food item. Instead of fighting or exhibiting aggressive behavior in order to win resources, exploitative competition occurs when resource use by one organism depletes the total amount available for other organisms. These organisms might never interact directly but compete by responding to changes in resource levels. Very obvious examples of this phenomenon include a diurnal species and a nocturnal species that nevertheless share the same resources or a plant that competes with neighboring plants for light, nutrients, and space for root growth.

This form of competition typically rewards those organisms who claim the resource first. As such, exploitation competition is often size-dependent and smaller organisms are favored since smaller organisms typically have higher foraging rates. Since smaller organisms have an advantage when exploitative competition is important in an ecosystem, this mechanism of competition might lead to a juvenile-driven generation cycle: individual juveniles succeed and grow fast, but once they mature they are outcompeted by smaller organisms.

In plants, exploitative competition can occur both above- and below ground. Aboveground, plants reduce the fitness of their neighbors by vying for sunlight plants consume nitrogen by absorbing it into their roots, making nitrogen unavailable to nearby plants. Plants that produce many roots typically reduce soil nitrogen to very low levels, eventually killing neighboring plants.

Exploitative competition has also been shown to occur both within species (intraspecific) and between different species (interspecific). Furthermore, many competitive interactions between organisms are some combination of exploitative and interference competition, meaning the two mechanisms are far from mutually exclusive. For example, a recent 2019 study found that the native thrip species Frankliniella intonsa was competitively dominant over an invasive thrip species Frankliniella occidentalis because it not only exhibited greater time feeding (exploitative competition) but also greater time guarding its resources (interference competition). Plants may also exhibit both forms of competition, not only scrambling for space for root growth but also directly inhibiting other plants' development through allelopathy.

== Apparent competition ==
Apparent competition occurs when two otherwise unrelated prey species indirectly compete for survival through a shared predator. This form of competition typically manifests in new equilibrium abundances of each prey species. For example, suppose there are two species (species A and species B), which are preyed upon by food-limited predator species C. Scientists observe an increase in the abundance of species A and a decline in the abundance of species B. In an apparent competition model, this relationship is found to be mediated through predator C; a population explosion of species A increases the abundance of predator species C due to a greater total food source. Since there are now more predators, species A and B would be hunted at higher rates than before. Thus, the success of species A was to the detriment of species B — not because they competed for resources, but because their increased numbers had indirect effects on the predator population.

This one-predator/two-prey model has been explored by ecologists as early as 1925, but the term apparent competition was coined by University of Florida ecologist Robert D. Holt in 1977. Holt found that field ecologists at the time were erroneously attributing negative interactions among prey species to niche partitioning and competitive exclusion, ignoring the role of food-limited predators.

=== Apparent competition and realized niche ===
Apparent competition can help shape a species' realized niche, or the area or resources the species can actually persist due to interspecific interactions. The effect on realized niches could be incredibly strong, especially when there is an absence of more traditional interference or exploitative competition. A real-world example was studied in the late 1960s, when the introduction of snowshoe hares (Lepus americanus) to Newfoundland reduced the habitat range of native arctic hares (Lepus arcticus). While some ecologists hypothesized that this was due to an overlap in the niche, other ecologists argued that the more plausible mechanism was that snowshoe hare populations led to an explosion in food-limited lynx populations, a shared predator of both prey species. Since the arctic hare has a relatively weaker defense tactic than the snowshoe hare, they were excluded from woodland areas on the basis of differential predation. However, both apparent competition and exploitation competition might help explain the situation to some degree. Support for the impact of competition on the breadth of the realized niche with respect to diet is becoming more common in a variety of systems based upon isotopic and spatial data, including both carnivores and small mammals.

=== Asymmetric apparent competition ===
Apparent competition can be symmetric or asymmetric. Symmetric apparent competition negatively impacts both species equally (-,-), from which it can be inferred that both species will persist. However, asymmetric apparent competition occurs when one species is affected less than the other. The most extreme scenario of asymmetric apparent competition is when one species is not affected at all by the increase in the predator, which can be seen as a form of amensalism (0, -). Human impacts on endangered prey species have been characterized by conservation scientists as an extreme form of asymmetric apparent competition, often through introducing predator species into ecosystems or resource subsidies. An example of fully asymmetric apparent competition which often occurs near urban centers is subsidies in the form of human garbage or waste. In the early 2000s, the common raven (Corvus corax) population in the Mojave Desert increased due to an influx of human garbage, leading to an indirect negative effect on juvenile desert tortoises (Gopherus agassizii). Asymmetry in apparent competition can also arise as a consequence of resource competition. An empirical example is provided by two small fish species in postglacial lakes in Western Canada, where resource competition between prickly sculpin and threespine stickleback fish leads to a spatial niche shift mainly in threespine stickleback. As a consequence of this shift, predation by a shared trout predator increases for stickleback but decreases for sculpin in lakes where the two species co-occur compared to lakes in which each species occurs on its own together with trout predators. Because sharing predators often comes together with competition for shared food resources, apparent competition and resource competition may often interplay in nature.

=== Apparent competition in the human microbiome ===
Apparent competition has also been viewed in and on the human body. The human immune system can acts as the generalist predator, and a high abundance of a certain bacteria may induce an immune response, damaging all pathogens in the body. Another example of this is of two populations of bacteria that can both support a predatory bacteriophage. In most situations, the one that is most resistant to infection by the shared predator will replace the other.

Apparent competition has also been suggested as an exploitable phenomenon for cancer treatments. Highly specialized viruses that are developed to target malignant cancer cells often go locally extinct prior to eradicating all cancer. However, if a virus were developed that targets both healthy and unhealthy host cells to some degree, the large number of healthy cells would support the predatory virus for long enough to eliminate all malignant cells.

== Size-asymmetric competition ==
Competition can be either complete symmetric (all individuals receive the same amount of resources, irrespective of their size), perfectly size symmetric (all individuals exploit the same amount of resource per unit biomass), or absolutely size-asymmetric (the largest individuals exploit all the available resource).

Among plants, size asymmetry is context-dependent and competition can be both asymmetric and symmetric depending on the most limiting resource. In forest stands, below-ground competition for nutrients and water is size-symmetric, because a tree's root system is typically proportionate to the biomass of the entire tree. Conversely, above-ground competition for light is size-asymmetric — since light has directionality, the forest canopy is dominated entirely by the largest trees. These trees disproportionately exploit most of the resource for their biomass, making the interaction size asymmetric. Whether above-ground or below-ground resources are more limiting can have major effects on the structure and diversity of ecological communities; in mixed beech stands, for example, size-asymmetric competition for light is a stronger predictor of growth compared with competition for soil resources.

== Within and between species ==
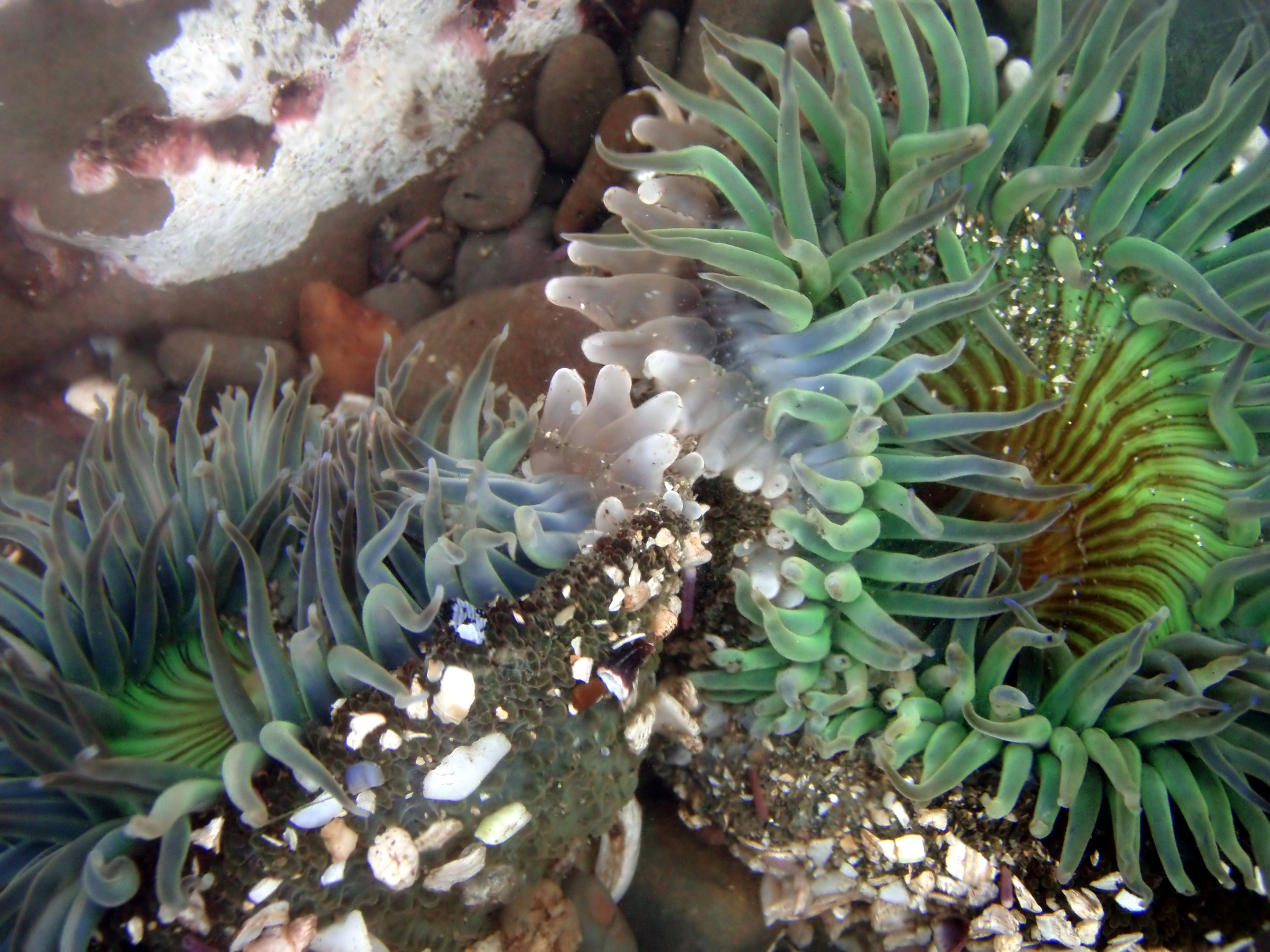
Sea anemones compete for the territory in tide pools

Competition can occur between individuals of the same species, called intraspecific competition, or between different species, called interspecific competition. Studies show that intraspecific competition can regulate population dynamics (changes in population size over time). This occurs because individuals become crowded as the population grows. Since individuals within a population require the same resources, crowding causes resources to become more limited. Some individuals (typically small juveniles) eventually do not acquire enough resources and die or do not reproduce. This reduces population size and slows population growth.

Species also interact with other species that require the same resources. Consequently, interspecific competition can alter the sizes of many species populations at the same time. Experiments demonstrate that when species compete for a limited resource, one species eventually drives the populations of other species extinct. These experiments suggest that competing species cannot coexist (they cannot live together in the same area) because the best competitor will exclude all other competing species.

=== Intraspecific ===
Intraspecific competition occurs when members of the same species compete for the same resources in an ecosystem. A simple example is a stand of equally-spaced plants, which are all of the same age. The higher the density of plants, the more plants will be present per unit ground area, and the stronger the competition will be for resources such as light, water, or nutrients.

=== Interspecific ===
Interspecific competition may occur when individuals of two separate species share a limiting resource in the same area. If the resource cannot support both populations, then lowered fecundity, growth, or survival may result in at least one species. Interspecific competition has the potential to alter populations, communities, and the evolution of interacting species. An example among animals could be the case of cheetahs and lions; since both species feed on similar prey, they are negatively impacted by the presence of the other because they will have less food, however, they still persist together, despite the prediction that under competition one will displace the other. In fact, lions sometimes steal prey items killed by cheetahs. Potential competitors can also kill each other, in so-called 'intraguild predation'. For example, in southern California coyotes often kill and eat gray foxes and bobcats, all three carnivores sharing the same stable prey (small mammals).

An example among protozoa involves Paramecium aurelia and Paramecium caudatum. Russian ecologist, Georgy Gause, studied the competition between the two species of Paramecium that occurred as a result of their coexistence. Through his studies, Gause proposed the Competitive exclusion principle, observing the competition that occurred when their different ecological niches overlapped.

Competition has been observed between individuals, populations, and species, but there is little evidence that competition has been the driving force in the evolution of large groups. For example, mammals lived beside reptiles for many millions of years of time but were unable to gain a competitive edge until dinosaurs were devastated by the Cretaceous–Paleogene extinction event.

== Evolutionary strategies ==
In evolutionary contexts, competition is related to the concept of r/K selection theory, which relates to the selection of traits which promote success in particular environments. The theory originates from work on island biogeography by the ecologists Robert MacArthur and E. O. Wilson.

In r/K selection theory, selective pressures are hypothesized to drive evolution in one of two stereotyped directions: r- or K-selection. These terms, r, and K, are derived from standard ecological algebra, as illustrated in the simple Verhulst equation of population dynamics:

$$\frac{dN}{dt}=rN\left(1 - \frac{N}{K}\right) \qquad \!$$

where r is the growth rate of the population (N), and K is the carrying capacity of its local environmental setting. Typically, r-selected species exploit empty niches, and produce many offspring, each of whom has a relatively low probability of surviving to adulthood. In contrast, K-selected species are strong competitors in crowded niches, and invest more heavily in much fewer offspring, each with a relatively high probability of surviving to adulthood.

== Competitive exclusion principle ==
1: a smaller (yellow) species of bird forages across whole tree. 2: a larger (red) species competes for resources. 3: red dominates in middle for the more abundant resources. Yellow adapts to a new niches, avoiding competition.

To explain how species coexist, in 1934 Georgii Gause proposed the competitive exclusion principle which is also called the Gause principle: species cannot coexist if they have the same ecological niche. The word "niche" refers to a species' requirements for survival and reproduction. These requirements include both resources (like food) and proper habitat conditions (like temperature or pH). Gause reasoned that if two species had identical niches (required identical resources and habitats) they would attempt to live in exactly the same area and would compete for exactly the same resources. If this happened, the species that was the best competitor would always exclude its competitors from that area. Therefore, species must at least have slightly different niches in order to coexist.

== Character displacement ==
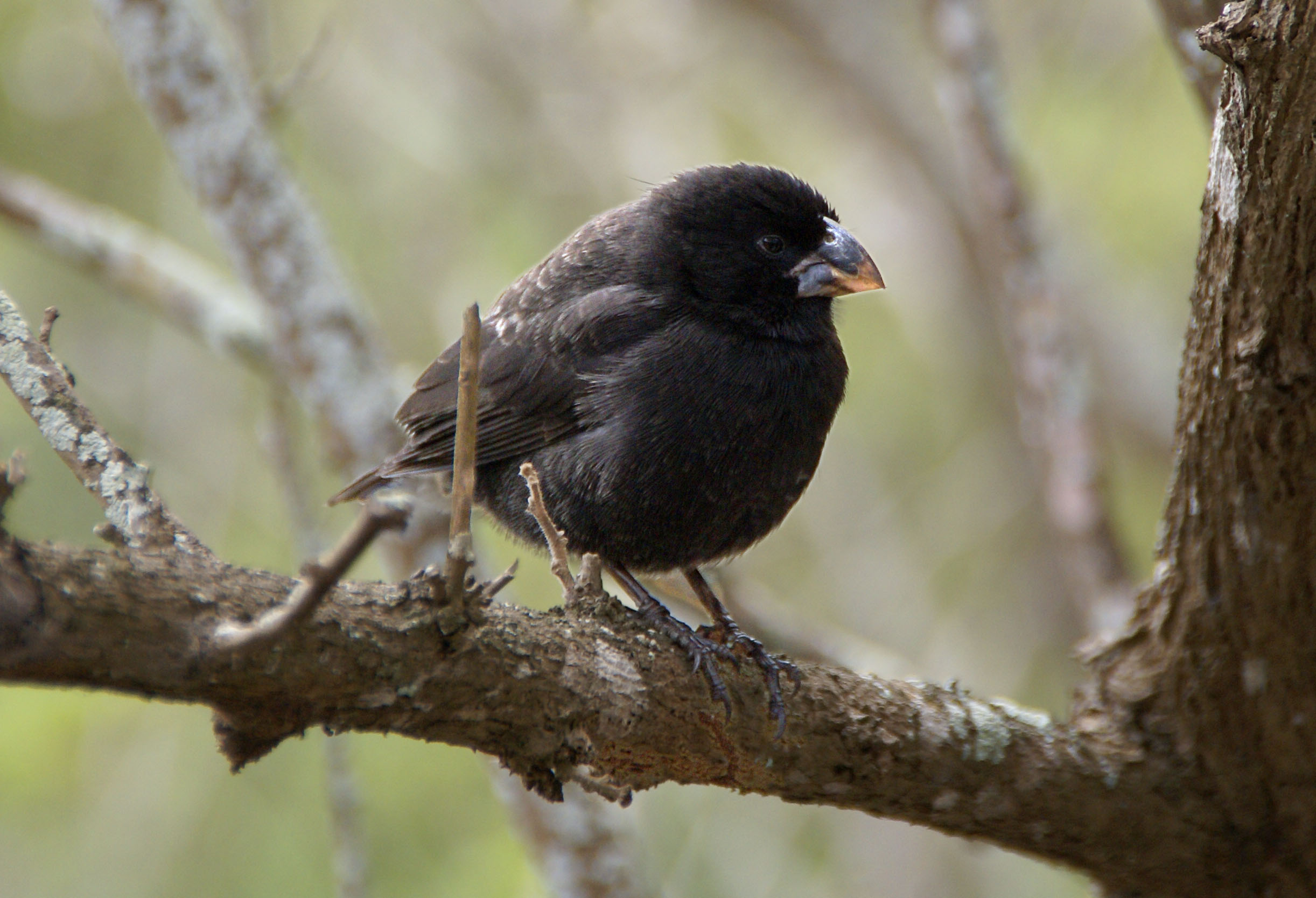
Medium ground finch (Geospiza fortis) on Santa Cruz Island in the Galapagos

Competition can cause species to evolve differences in traits. This occurs because the individuals of a species with traits similar to competing species always experience strong interspecific competition. These individuals have less reproduction and survival than individuals with traits that differ from their competitors. Consequently, they will not contribute many offspring to future generations. For example, Darwin's finches can be found alone or together on the Galapagos Islands. Both species populations actually have more individuals with intermediate-sized beaks when they live on islands without the other species present. However, when both species are present on the same island, competition is intense between individuals that have intermediate-sized beaks of both species because they all require intermediate-sized seeds. Consequently, individuals with small and large beaks have greater survival and reproduction on these islands than individuals with intermediate-sized beaks. Different finch species can coexist if they have traits—for instance, beak size—that allow them to specialize in particular resources. When Geospiza fortis and Geospiza fuliginosa are present on the same island, G. fuliginosa tends to evolve a small beak and G. fortis a large beak. The observation that competing species' traits are more different when they live in the same area than when competing species live in different areas is called character displacement. For the two finch species, beak size was displaced: Beaks became smaller in one species and larger in the other species. Studies of character displacement are important because they provide evidence that competition is important in determining ecological and evolutionary patterns in nature.

== See also ==
- Biological interaction
- Character displacement
- Community
- Minimum viable population
- Scramble competition
- Resource (biology)
- Resource partitioning
