= Klaus Rohde =

German biologist

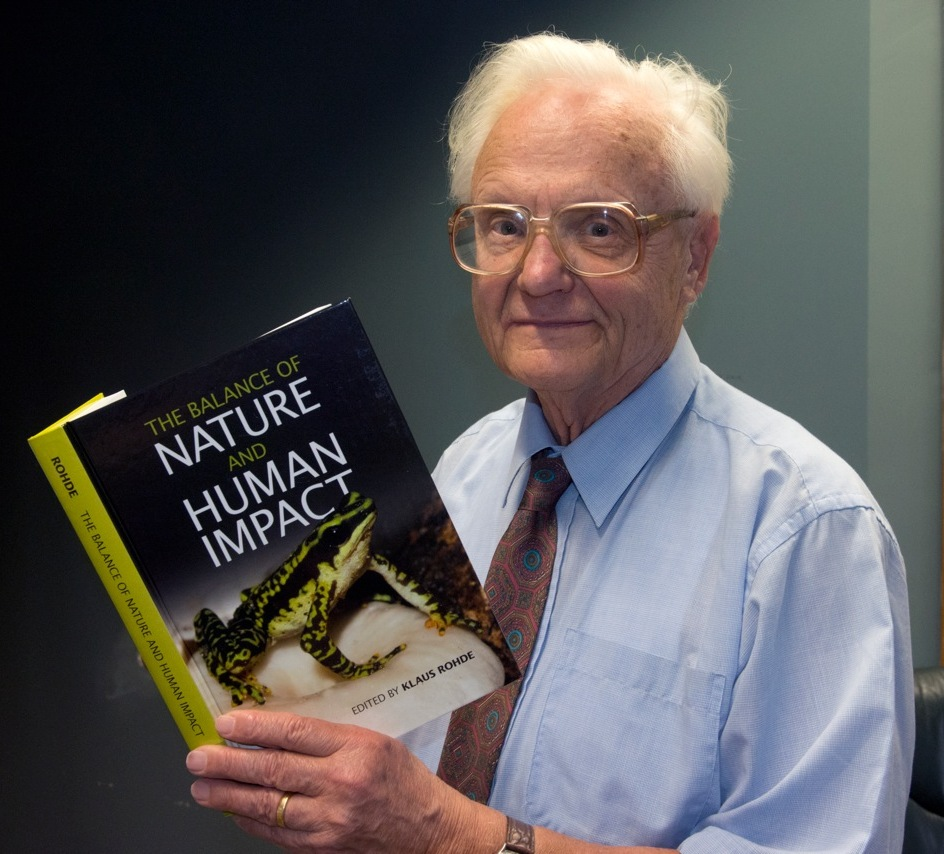
- Born: 30 March 1932 (age 94); Brandenburg an der Havel, Germany
- Education: University of Potsdam; University of Münster
- Known for: Latitudinal gradients; Ecology of marine parasites; Ultrastructure of lower invertebrates
- Awards: Clarke Medal
- Scientific career
- Fields: Biology, ecology, parasitology, ultrastructure
- Workplaces: University of New England, Australia

Klaus Rohde (born 30 March 1932) is a German biologist and parasitologist at the University of New England (UNE), Australia. He is known particularly for his work on marine parasitology, evolutionary ecology, zoogeography, phylogeny, and ultrastructure of lower invertebrates.

== Early life and education ==
Klaus Rohde was born in Brandenburg an der Havel, Germany, on 30 March 1932. He attended the Saldria Gymnasium and Nikolai-Schule in Brandenburg, earning his Abitur in 1949. Rohde went on to study at the Teachers Training College in Brandenburg, receiving, in 1950, a Teacher's Diploma in Russian language. From 1950 to 1951, he studied Slavic languages at the University of Potsdam. Near the end of 1951 he moved from East to West Germany, enrolling at the University of Münster, studying botany, zoology, physics and physiological chemistry. Rohde undertook research for his PhD in 1954, under the supervision of Berhard Rensch, a notable German zoologist; his thesis was on the behaviour and physiology of Paramecium. In 1957 he was awarded his PhD, magna cum laude.

== Career ==
From 1957 to 1959, he did scientific work at ASTA-Werke, Brackwede/Westfalen (pharmaceutical industry) on the development of new tests for screening anthelminthic drugs (filariasis, hookworms, cysticercus). From 1960 to 1967, Rohde was a lecturer at the University of Malaya, Kuala Lumpur, conducting work on the taxonomy, life cycles and fine structure of trematodes and monogeneans and supervising BSc. Honours, MSc. and PhD candidates. He participated in expeditions to various parts of Malaysia and visited many countries in Eastern, Southeastern, Southern Asia, and America.

From 1967 to 1970 he was a Research Fellow (Habilitandenstipendiat) at the Ruhr University Bochum, Germany. Habilitation in Bochum was successfully concluded in 1970 with a thesis on the morphology, life cycle and ultrastructure of the aspidogastrean Multicotyle purvisi.

He moved to Australia in 1970 to assume a two-year Postdoctoral Fellowship at the University of Queensland, Australia, with research on the taxonomy, ecology, life cycles and ultrastructure of the aspidogastrean Lobatostoma manteri and various monogenea. During this period, he visited the Great Barrier Reef as part of his work. In 1972 he was Reader in Zoology at the University of Khartoum, Sudan.

1973–1976 he was Director of the Heron Island Research Station, Great Barrier Reef, conducting research on the taxonomy and ecology of Monogenea and Aspidogastrea. The University of Queensland awarded him the degree of DSc. in 1975 for his parasitological and zoological work. In 1976 he was appointed Lecturer at the University of New England (UNE), Australia, subsequently promoted to Associate Professor and Professor (Personal Chair). In 2001 he became professor emeritus.

== Research and work ==
Rohde's main research fields are fine structure, ecology, zoogeography, parasitology, and phylogeny of invertebrates, particularly of Aspidogastrea, Monogenea, Amphilinidea, and general aspects of ecology (niche theory, competition) and zoogeography (latitudinal gradients). He supervised many BSc.Honours, MSc. and PhD candidates in these fields, and, jointly with Tim Littlewood at the Natural History Museum London, Nikki Watson, UNE and others, studied the phylogeny of Platyhelminthes, using ultrastructure, life cycle and DNA data.

His scientific contributions are on the following topics:

- Marine parasitology.
- Latitudinal gradients in species diversity (hypothesis of effective evolutionary time).
- Niche theory (vacant niches, Mating hypothesis of niche restriction).
- Phylogeny of Platyhelminthes and other invertebrates using ultrastructure and DNA.
- Ultrastructure of spermatogenesis, protonephridia, sensory receptors of Platyhelminthes.
- Taxonomy in particular of trematodes and monogeneans (many new species, 11 new genera and 2 new subfamilies, for one new genus a new family has now been established).
- Life cycles of Aspidogastrea and Amphilinidea.

Rohde was the first who supplied quantitative evidence for the enormous species diversity of marine parasites in tropical (coral reef) waters, and for differences in latitudinal gradients between endo- and ectoparasites. His hypothesis of effective evolutionary time was an important stimulus for the development of the metabolic theory of ecology. His work on the phylogeny of Platyhelminthes provided evidence that the Neodermata (major groups of parasitic Platyhelminthes) have split early off the other flatworm groups. His demonstration of the great number and variety of sensory receptors and of the great complexity of nervous systems in some parasitic flatworms is convincing evidence that sacculinization (reduction in complexity) of parasites is not a general phenomenon. Rohde's work on the ecology of marine parasites has shown that most parasites live in largely non-saturated niche space, i.e., that most niches are vacant; proceeding from these findings, he concluded that equilibrium conditions in animal communities are the exception rather than the rule (discussed in detail in his book Nonequilibrium Ecology).

After retirement he continues to publish scientific papers and books. He has cooperated with Dietrich Stauffer, a theoretical physicist, in using mathematical models to investigate latitudinal gradients in species diversity and niche width. He is running two blogs with articles and posts on science, politics and philosophy

== Honors ==
- Clarke Medal of the Royal Society of New South Wales (1996, Zoology).
- Inaugural Award for Excellence in Science of the Vice-Chancellor, University of New England (UNE), Australia (1996).
- Fellow of various scientific societies and institutes including the Australian Society for Parasitology.
- Many genera and species as well as a subfamily were named after Klaus Rohde to honour him for his taxonomic work.

== Personal life ==
Rohde lived and worked in Münster/Westfalen (Germany), Brackwede/Bielefeld (Germany), Bochum (Germany), Kuala Lumpur (Malaysia), Khartoum (Sudan), Heron Island (Great Barrier Reef) and Brisbane (Australia). He now lives in Armidale (Australia).

== Bibliography ==
Rohde has published about 480 scientific papers in international journals and book chapters, as well as several books.

=== Books ===
- Rohde, Klaus (1993). Ecology of Marine Parasites 2nd edition. Wallingford, Oxon, U.K.: CAB International. ISBN 0-85198-845-8.
- Rohde, Klaus (2005). Nonequilibrium Ecology. Cambridge, U.K.: Cambridge University Press. ISBN 0-521-67455-7.
- Rohde, Klaus, ed. (2005). Marine Parasitology. Melbourne and Wallingford, Oxon, U.K.: CSIRO Publ. and CAB International. ISBN 1-84593-053-3.
- Rohde, Klaus, ed. (2013). The Balance of Nature and Human Impact. Cambridge, U.K.: Cambridge University Press. ISBN 978-1-107-01961-4.

The first edition of Ecology of Marine Parasites, University of Queensland Press 1982, has been translated into Malay-Indonesian: Ekologi Parasit Laut, Dewan Bahasa dan Pustaka, Kuala Lumpur.

=== Selected papers and book chapters ===
- 1966 Sense receptors of Multicotyle purvisi Dawes (Trematoda, Aspidobothria). Nature, 211, 820–822.
- 1972 The Aspidogastrea, especially Multicotyle purvisi Dawes, 1941. Advances in Parasitology, 10, 77–151.
- 1975 Fine structure of the Monogenea, especially Polystomoides. Advances in Parasitology, 13, 1–33.
- 1976 Species diversity of parasites on the Great Barrier Reef. Zeitschrift für Parasitenkunde, 50, 93–94.
- 1977 A non-competitive mechanism responsible for restricting niches. Zoologischer Anzeiger, 199, 164–172
- 1978 Latitudinal differences in species diversity and their causes. I. A review of the hypotheses explaining the gradients. Biologisches Zentralblatt, 97, 393–403.
- 1978 Latitudinal gradients in species diversity and their causes. II. Marine parasitological evidence for a time hypothesis. Biologisches Zentralblatt, 97, 405–418.
- 1979 A critical evaluation of intrinsic and extrinsic factors responsible for niche restriction in parasites. American Naturalist, 114, 648–671.
- 1984 Helminth Diseases of Marine Fishes. In Diseases of Marine Animals, vol. IV (ed. O Kinne.). Biol. Anst. Helgoland, 193–320, 435–501.
- 1991 Intra- and interspecific interactions in low density populations in resource-rich habitats. Oikos, 60, 91–104.
- 1992 Latitudinal gradients in species diversity: the search for the primary cause. Oikos, 65, 514–527.
- 1993 with M Heap and D Heap. Rapoport's rule does not apply to marine teleosts and cannot explain latitudinal gradients in species richness. American Naturalist, 142, 1–16.
- 1994 The minor groups of parasitic Platyhelminthes. Advances in Parasitology, 33, 145–234.
- 1994 Niche restriction in parasites: proximate and ultimate causes. Parasitology, 109, S69-S84.
- 1997 The origins of parasitism in the Platyhelminthes: a summary interpreted on the basis of recent literature. International Journal for Parasitology, 27, 739–746.
- 1998 with M Heap. Latitudinal differences in species and community richness and in community structure of metazoan endo- and ectoparasites of marine teleost fish. International Journal for Parasitology, 28, 461–474.
- 1999 with D T J Littlewood and K A Clough. The interrelationships of all major groups of Platyhelminthes – phylogenetic evidence from morphology and molecules. Biological Journal of the Linnean Society, 66, 75–114.
- 1999 with D T J Littlewood, R A Bray and E A Herniou. Phylogeny of the Platyhelminthes and the evolution of parasitism. Biological Journal of the Linnean Society, 68, 257–287.
- 1999 with I D Whittington and L A Chisholm. The larvae of Monogenea (Platyhelminthes). Advances in Parasitology, 44, 139–232.
- 2001 The Aspidogastrea, an archaic group of Platyhelminthes. In: Interrelationships of the Platyhelminthes, pp. 159–167. (eds. D T J Littlewood and R A Bray). Taylor & Francis, London and New York.
- 2001 Protonephridia as phylogenetic characters. In: Interrelationships of the Platyhelminthes, pp. 203–216. (eds. D T J Littlewood and R A Bray). Taylor & Francis., London and New York.
- 2002 with N J Gotelli. Co-occurrence of ectoparasites of marine fishes: null model analysis. Ecology Letters, 5, 86–94.
- 2002 Ecology and biogeography of marine parasites. Advances in Marine Biology, 43, 1–86.
- 2006 with D Stauffer. Simulation of geographical trends in Chowdhury ecosystem model. Advances in Complex Systems 8, 451–464.
- 2008 with P P Rohde. How to measure host specificity. Vie et Milieu (Life and Environment) 58, 121–124.
- 2010 Marine parasite diversity and environmental gradients. In: S Morand and B Krasnov (eds.). The Biogeography of Host-Parasite Interactions. Oxford University Press, pp. 73–88.

Awards
Preceded by Christopher McAuley Powell	Clarke Medal; 1996	Succeeded by Charles Barry Osmond
