= Janzen–Connell hypothesis =

Explanation for tree species biodiversity in rainforests

The Janzen–Connell hypothesis is a well-known hypothesis for the maintenance of high species biodiversity in the tropics. It was published independently in the early 1970s by Daniel Janzen, who focused on tropical trees, and Joseph Connell who discussed trees and marine invertebrates. According to their hypothesis, host-specific herbivores, pathogens, or other natural enemies (sometimes also referred to as predators) make the areas near a parent tree (the seed-producing tree) inhospitable for the survival of seeds or seedlings. These natural enemies are referred to as 'distance-responsive predators' if they kill seeds or seedlings near the parent tree, or 'density-dependent predators' if they kill seeds or seedlings where they are most abundant (which is typically near the parent tree). Such predators can prevent any one species from dominating the landscape, because if that species is too common, there will be few safe places for its seedlings to survive. Both Janzen and Connell originally proposed that for natural enemies to increase local diversity, they must be host-specific (also called specialists) and relatively immobile, such that they disproportionately reduce the density of the more locally common tree species. This prevents any one species from becoming dominant and excluding other species through competition, allowing more species to coexist in small areas. This can be classified as a stabilizing mechanism.

Notably, Janzen–Connell effects provide a recruitment advantage to locally-rare trees, since they act primarily on seeds and seedlings. These effects promote the establishment of rare tree species, but do nothing to ensure the survival of these species post-germination.

The Janzen–Connell hypothesis has been called a special case of keystone predation, predator partitioning or the pest pressure hypothesis. The pest pressure hypothesis states that plant diversity is maintained by specialist natural enemies. The Janzen–Connell hypothesis expands on this, by claiming that the natural enemies are not only specialists, but also are distance-responsive or density-dependent.

Both Connell and Janzen, but particularly Connell, proposed that natural enemies will be more likely to prevent competitive dominance in more climatically stable environments. This led both authors to predict that natural enemies contribute to the latitudinal diversity gradient by promoting local coexistence of many species in the warm, stable, highly productive climates of the wet tropics. This does not negate that Janzen-Connell effects may also happen in temperate forests. The black cherry is one such example of a temperate forest species whose growth patterns can be explained by the Janzen–Connell hypothesis.

== History ==
=== Daniel Janzen’s hypothesis ===
Daniel Janzen published his hypothesis in 1970 in The American Naturalist under the article "Herbivores and the Number of Tree Species in Tropical Forests." His hypothesis was based on the observation that in tropical forests (when compared to temperate forests), there were few new adult trees in the immediate vicinity of their parent tree. He explained the low density of tropical trees and lack of "bunching" of tree types around parent trees for two reasons: (1) the number of seeds decline with distance from the parent tree and (2) that the adult tree, its seeds, and seedlings are a source of food for host-specific parasites and diseases. Using his observations, Janzen created a model demonstrating the probability of a seed maturation or a seedling survival as a function of distance from the parent tree (as well as total seed count, dispersal mechanism, and predatory activity).

=== Joseph Connell hypothesis ===
Joseph Connell published his hypothesis in 1970 in Dynamics of Populations. Unlike Janzen, Connell proposed experiments that focused on the key prediction that exclusion of host-specific predators would cause a decrease in diversity as tree species with greater establishment or competitive ability formed low-diversity seedling and sapling communities where dominance was concentrated in a few species.

He formed his hypothesis through observations in Queensland, Australia. Along with Jack Greening Tracey and Larry Johnson Webb, he mapped trees in two rainforests and observed that smaller seedlings tended to occur in single-species clumps. Smaller seedlings also exhibited greater mortality, especially when their nearest neighbor was an individual of the same species. This pattern lessened with growth and age until seedlings exhibited similar pattern diversity to adults. To reinforce these observations, Connell ran an experiment showing that adult trees have a deleterious effect on smaller trees of the same species. In another experiment, Connell found that pre-germination predation was greater on seeds near adults of the same species than those near adults of others. Through these observations, Connell suggests that each tree species has host-specific enemies that attack it and any of its offspring which are close to the parent. This emphasizes the importance of the role of predation in preventing trees from forming single-species groves, which is probably the only way in which one species of tree could exclude others by interspecies competition.

== Effects on forest dynamics ==
=== Disease dynamics and tree density ===
Plant pathogens follow infectious disease dynamics. The basic reproductive rate $(R_0)$ of a disease is dependent on three variables such that:

R_{0} = βLS

where β is the transmission rate or infectiousness of the disease, L is the average infection time of the host, and S is the density of the host population. By decreasing any one of the variables, the reproduction rate of the disease decreases. Since seed dispersal is such that the highest density of seeds is around the parent with density decreasing with distance from the parent, the reproduction rate of a disease infecting seeds and seedlings will be highest around the parent and decrease with distance. Thus, seedlings close to the parent are likely to die due to the disease prevalence. However, seedlings farther away are less likely to encounter the disease and therefore will more likely grow into adults.

=== Herbivory and tree density ===
Specialist herbivores who consume plant matter can also be thought of as having a "transmission rate" between individuals similarly to a disease. Tree predators (especially herbivorous insects) are limited by the ease of movement. When individuals are closer together at high density, movement between trees is easier and the predators quickly spread out. However, at low tree density, predators can not find the next individual with as much ease and thus often have low transmission rates leading to less specialist predation.

== Problematic aspects ==
Many studies examining the Janzen–Connell hypothesis have shown supporting patterns with a number of tree species, but despite this there are also problematic aspects of the hypothesis.

1. The Janzen–Connell hypothesis explains diversity at a community-wide scale, but most studies have only looked at a single species or a localized region. Most studies do not test the diversity prediction and did not determine the causes for patterns consistent with Janzen–Connell effects. As Wright (2002) pointed out, "field measurements only demonstrate that niche differences, Janzen–Connell effects, and negative density dependence occur. Implications for species coexistence and plant diversity remain conjectural."
2. While these host-specific predators may play keystone species roles as they possibly aid in the prevention of superior tree competitors from monopolizing an area, no study has yet to examine species richness and abundance after removing natural enemies, creating a gap in the supporting research for the hypothesis.
3. Diversity may be maintained, at least in part, by episodic outbreaks of specialized pests, which may reduce the survivorship, growth, and reproductive success of adults of a species whenever they are particularly aggregated. Thus, specialist predation also impacts adult density, rather than just that of juveniles, the latter of which has been the focus of research efforts.
4. Disease and predation may be just affecting overall density rather than in localized regions around adults alone.
5. Theoretical work has suggested that distance-responsive predators are less able to promote coexistence than equivalent predators that are not distance-responsive.
6. Many empirical studies have shown that few natural enemies are host-specific specialists, as the original hypothesis claimed. However, theoretical work has suggested that predators can have broader diets as long as they are more damaging to their primary host than other species.
7. The responses of density-dependent predators' may not be restricted to a single trophic level, and when multiple trophic levels interact, Janzen–Connell effects may be negated. This is an example of "the enemy of my enemy is my friend" and it has been shown that the potential of host-specific insects to induce negative-density dependence in plant populations can be severely limited when the natural enemies of the seed predators are also density responsive.

== Research testing the hypothesis ==
Many tests of the Janzen-Connell hypothesis focus on whether seed or seedling survival is lower when they are closer to a conspecific (same-species) tree (distance dependence) or when seeds or seedlings are closer to seeds or seedlings of the same species (density dependence), rather than testing the prevalence or attack rates of natural enemies explicitly. Fewer studies assess the geographic implication that Janzen-Connell effects are stronger in the tropics.

=== Supporting research ===
There have been many studies designed to test predictions of this hypothesis in tropical and other settings. Studies that have supported the Janzen–Connell hypothesis include:

- A 2010 study of 8 tree species in Panama found evidence for strong Janzen–Connell effects. Seedlings tended to do worse when grown with soil microorganisms from under their own species or when grown in the field under their own species, compared to when grown under other species. Authors attributed these effects to microorganisms in the soil.
- A 2008 study in grasslands showed that soil-borne pests created a feedback very similar to the Janzen–Connell effect, supporting the hypothesis as a driver of diversity in temperate ecosystems. This study suggests that the predator/density mechanism that promotes species diversity is not contained to tropical forests alone, even if tropical ecosystems do have the highest diversity. This supports the hypothesis as a mechanism for diversity, but not as an explanation latitudinal gradients in species diversity.
- An examination of spatial data for 24 woody tropical rain forest plants showed either density-dependence or distance-dependence in plant offspring, supporting the hypothesis. However, other causal factors such as allelopathy were also suggested in some cases.
- In another field study in Panama, this one following seedling survival of tropical forest trees, Comita et al. found that seedlings generally experienced stronger negative density dependent effects from neighbours of their own species than those of other species, consistent with the Janzen-Connell hypothesis. They found that these effects were stronger in rare species, suggesting Janzen-Connell effects might contribute to their rarity, but reanalysis suggested these species differences were a statistical artifact.

=== Dissenting research ===
Studies questioning the Janzen–Connell hypothesis:

- A 2021 meta-analysis of experimental tests for Janzen-Connell effects found strong evidence for conspecific negative density dependence for seedlings but not seeds, and no increase in these effects toward lower latitudes.
- Hyatt et al. examined the hypothesis across a number of tree species (rather than focusing on the effects on just one) and found no support for the distance-dependence of the hypothesis and concluded that the Janzen–Connell hypothesis was not a mechanism for diversity. They did find however that in temperate settings, distance from parent reduced survivorship. But in tropical settings there was a slight positive correlation between the improved competitive ability of seeds and distance from parent. These findings were later challenged: Using additional data, and slightly different statistical techniques, Comita et al. showed that there was strong evidence for distance-dependence at the seedling stage, but not at the seed stage.
- A 1994 study by Burkey found that seed predation did not follow a pattern supporting that of the Janzen–Connell hypothesis along a meaningful scale. Seeds within 1 metre from the trunk were highly predated. However, seeds reached their peak density while still under the canopy of their parent. The authors concluded that seed predation did not follow the Janzen–Connell hypothesis.

== Current conclusions and further research ==
It is tricky to form conclusions regarding the accuracy of the Janzen–Connell hypothesis as it is difficult to falsify. This is because:

- Heavy predation may keep some species rare and widely spaced, and these species may also be the best competitors (although it is unclear why this would be the case). If so, these species are most likely to form dense aggregations that would reduce diversity in local areas. But due to their rarity or a belief that rare species are not regulated by density-dependence, these species may be the ones least likely to be studied.
- This means that the failure to find Janzen–Connell effects for what could be hundreds of tree species does not reject the hypothesis, as ecologists are missing the few key species where it does apply. However, dissenting findings do reduce the importance of the hypothesis for explaining overall coexistence of a number species.
  - For example, Hyatt et al. (2003) found that there were "individual cases of conformity to the hypothesis," which is all that is needed for the hypothesis to work if the specific cases represent tree species that are excellent competitors, highly shade tolerant, habitat generalists, or some combination of these traits that would allow these species to otherwise dominate the ecosystem.

It is likely that a number of mechanisms underscore the coexistence of similar species and thus cause biodiversity in ecosystems. It is possible the Janzen–Connell hypothesis is applicable only for some species depending on species characteristics. The hypothesis may also be affected by the kind of predator or pathogen as preliminary research has shown that the hypothesis is true only when host-specific predators have limited mobility with a range less than the seed dispersal range.

== See also ==
- Ecological fitting
