= Realized niche width =

Term in ecology

Realized niche width is a phrase relating to ecology, is defined by the actual space that an organism inhabits and the resources it can access as a result of limiting pressures from other species (e.g. superior competitors). An organism's ecological niche is determined by the biotic and abiotic factors that make up that specific ecosystem that allow that specific organism to survive there. The width of an organism's niche is set by the range of conditions a species is able to survive in that specific environment.

== Definition ==
The fundamental niche width of an organism refers to the theoretical range of conditions that an organism could survive and reproduce in without considering interspecific interactions. The fundamental niche exclusively considers limiting biotic and abiotic factors such as appropriate food sources and a suitable climate. The fundamental niche width often differs from the realized niche width (the areas actually inhabited by a given species). This differentiation is due to interspecific competition with other species within their ecosystem while still considering the biotic and abiotic limiting factors. A species' realized niche is usually much narrower than its fundamental niche width as it is forced to adjust its niche around the superior competing species.

The physical area where a species lives, is its habitat. The set of environmental features essential to that species' survival, is its "niche." (Ecology. Begon, Harper, Townsend)

== Importance ==
The difference between the realized and the fundamental niche is important in understanding how interactions with a variety of different species in one environment affects the fitness of another species. This is not only important in understanding how a species functions in an ecosystem, but it is also important in determining the potential and realized success of invasive species. Invasive species could thrive or be killed off in an environment where they would theoretically be able to exist based on the presence or lack of there of different species. To survive, an invasive species first has to successfully survive the journey to the new area, they then have to be able to survive in that habitat. After this, they then must to be able to successfully compete and reproduce with the other species already in the new, invaded environment. Considering these factors, not all invasive species are devastating to the new environment they inhabit as they must first overcome these other challenges before they can negatively affect their new environment.

In an organism's niche, the abiotic and biotic factors determine the ability of a species to survive; However, both the abiotic and biotic factors of that environment can be changed by that species' existence. A species' impact on its biotic environment in its niche tends to affect not only that species' ability to survive, but the other species it coexists with. Again, these changes are important in understanding the effects of invasive species in a new habitat. The ability of a new species to change an environment's abiotic and biotic factors can make a previously habitable environment for a species uninhabitable. The extinction of this species can further change the biotic factors of an environment. Invasive species not only directly affect the biotic environment, but they indirectly affect this environment by affecting the species able to survive in this habitat.

Niche theory states that a species' ranges are limited by their physiological tolerances (fundamental niche) and their biotic limitations (realized niche). The survival rates of organisms facing rapid niche shifts help scientists predict the future effects of climate change and invasive species on current ecological communities. The ability of organisms to shift niches also helps scientists understand community formation and speciation. Niche shifts for invasive species in their native environment differ from those in their newly invaded environment. After an invasive species is introduced to their new environment, they have to cope with new biotic factors, environmental constraints, and climate differences. These variables play a role in determining how the organism's niche will evolve. Biophysical models use links between an organism's preferred climate and their functional traits to determine where an organism could survive without taking biotic factors into account.

== Experiments ==
=== Barnacles ===
The phenomenon of fundamental and realized niches was documented by the ecologist Joseph Connell in his study of species overlap between barnacles on intertidal rocks. He observed that Chthamalus stellatus and Balanus balanoides inhabited the upper and lower strata of intertidal rocks respectively, but only Chthamalus barnacles could survive both the upper and lower strata without desiccation. The removal of Balanus barnacles from the lower strata, resulted in the Chthamalus barnacles occupying its fundamental niche (both upper and lower strata) which is much larger than its realized niche in the upper strata.

This experiment was conducted on the rocky intertidal because of its accessibility and the large amount of previous research done on the species living there. Many of the species that live here are also sedentary or slow moving, making them easier to study. The different species are also more easily manipulated creating experimental and control groups that can be better studied because of their sedentary or slow moving state. The goal of Connell's experiment was to determine how much physical and biotic competition factors affected community structure in the rocky intertidal ecosystem. Vertical zonation also plays a role in determining the placement of different species in the rocky intertidal ecosystem which was previously thought to be due to the tides.

=== Invasion biology ===
A study by Tingley et al. focuses on the invasion of the cane toad (Rhinella marina, formerly Bufo marinus) of Australia. Through thermal acclimation and development of improved movement functions, this toad has expanded its habitat range significantly. Evidence in this study showed that there was a difference between the toad's native niche and its invaded environment niche. A review of 180 case studies showed only 50% of invasive species went through a niche shift; however, niche changes are determined in a variety of different ways making it hard to determine how accurate this study is.

It was also proven that the toad's increased range was only observed in Australia and not in its native environment even though the same physical conditions were present in both. This means that biotic factors and/or dispersal barriers limit the toad in its native environment. Without these constraints in its invaded environment, the toad is able to fill out its fundamental niche. Determining realized niches help with developing biotic control agents for invasive species, and determining an organism's fundamental niche help scientist's conclude how well a species would be able to survive and adapt to climate change.

=== Pathogens ===
Another study by Truong et al. reviewed the use of plants as the realized niche for the human pathogen Listeria monocytogenes. This paper focuses on how this pathogen uses a plant as its realized niche. The fundamental niche of this pathogen can be determined through studies where the pathogen is grown aseptically (without other pathogens); however, abiotic and biotic factors limit the ability for this pathogen to exist in nature. This study was not able to clearly determine how this pathogen and plants survive together. However, it was shown that the plants did not defend itself against the presence of this pathogen. This study did support the theory that this pathogen can use plant nutrients to survive and multiply if the plants environment and competition allows. However, more comprehensive research will need to be conducted to determine this pathogen's realized niche. This study further shows how determining an organism's realized niche can help understand this human pathogen's natural history.
