= Balance of nature =

Superseded ecological theory

The balance of nature, also known as ecological balance, is a theory that proposes that ecological systems are usually in a stable equilibrium or homeostasis, which is to say that a small change (the size of a particular population, for example) will be corrected by some negative feedback that will bring the parameter back to its original "point of balance" with the rest of the system. The balance is sometimes depicted as easily disturbed and delicate, while other times it is inversely portrayed as powerful enough to correct any imbalances by itself. The concept has been described as "normative", as well as teleological, as it makes a claim about how nature should be: nature is balanced because "it is supposed to be balanced". The theory has been employed to describe how populations depend on each other, for example in predator-prey systems, or relationships between herbivores and their food source. It is also sometimes applied to the relationship between the Earth's ecosystem, the composition of the atmosphere, and weather.

The theory has been discredited by scientists working in ecology, as it has been found that constant disturbances leading to chaotic and dynamic changes are the norm in nature. During the later half of the 20th century, it was superseded by catastrophe theory, chaos theory, and thermodynamics. Nevertheless, the idea maintains popularity amongst conservationists, environmentalists and the general public.

== History of the theory ==
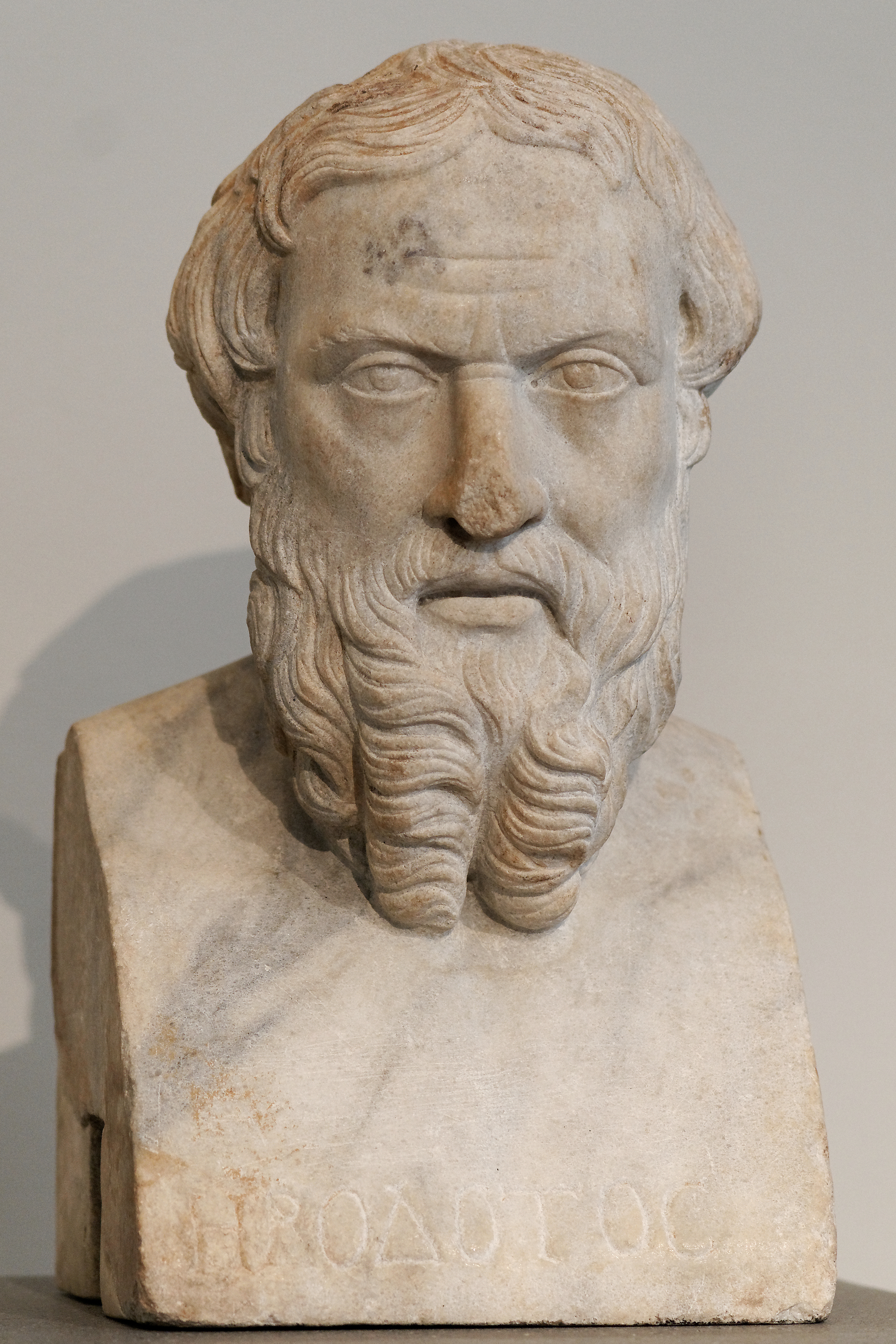
Herodotus asserted that predators never excessively consume prey populations and described this balance as "wonderful"

The concept that nature maintains its condition is of ancient provenance. Herodotus asserted that predators never excessively consume prey populations and described this balance as "wonderful". Two of Plato's dialogues, the Timaeus and Protagoras myths, support the balance of nature concept. Cicero advanced the theory of "a balance of nature generated by different reproductive rates and traits among species, as well as interactions among species".

The balance of nature concept once ruled ecological research and governed the management of natural resources. This led to a doctrine popular among some conservationists that nature was best left to its own devices, and that human intervention into it was by definition unacceptable.

The theory was a central theme in the 1962 book Silent Spring by Rachel Carson, widely considered to be the most important environmental book of the 20th century. The controversial Gaia hypothesis was developed in the 1970s by James Lovelock and Lynn Margulis. It asserts that living beings interact with Earth to form a complex system which self-regulates to maintain the balance of nature.

The validity of a balance of nature was already questioned in the early 1900s, but the general abandonment of the theory by scientists working in ecology only happened in the last quarter of that century, when studies showed that it did not match what could be observed among plant and animal populations.

== Predator-prey interactions ==
Predator-prey populations tend to show chaotic behavior within limits, where the sizes of populations change in a way that may appear random but is, in fact, obeying deterministic laws based only on the relationship between a population and its food source illustrated by the Lotka–Volterra equation. An experimental example of this was shown in an eight-year study on small Baltic Sea creatures such as plankton, which were isolated from the rest of the ocean. Each member of the food web was shown to take turns multiplying and declining, even though the scientists kept the outside conditions constant. An article in the journal Nature stated: "Advanced mathematical techniques proved the indisputable presence of chaos in this food web ... short-term prediction is possible, but long-term prediction is not."

== Human intervention ==
Although some conservationist organizations argue that human activity is incompatible with a balanced ecosystem, there are numerous examples in history showing that several modern-day habitats originate from human activity: some of Latin America's rain forests owe their existence to humans planting and transplanting them, while the abundance of grazing animals in the Serengeti plain of Africa is thought by some ecologists to be partly due to human-set fires that created savanna habitats.

One frequently cited example of human influence on ecosystem processes is the Australian Aboriginal practice of fire-stick farming. This practice uses low-intensity fire, applied when humidity is high enough to limit its spread, to reduce the amount of ground-level combustible material and thereby reduce the intensity and extent of forest fires started by lightning at the end of the dry season. Several plant species are adapted to such fire regimes, and some even require high temperatures to trigger seed germination.

== Continued popularity of the theory ==
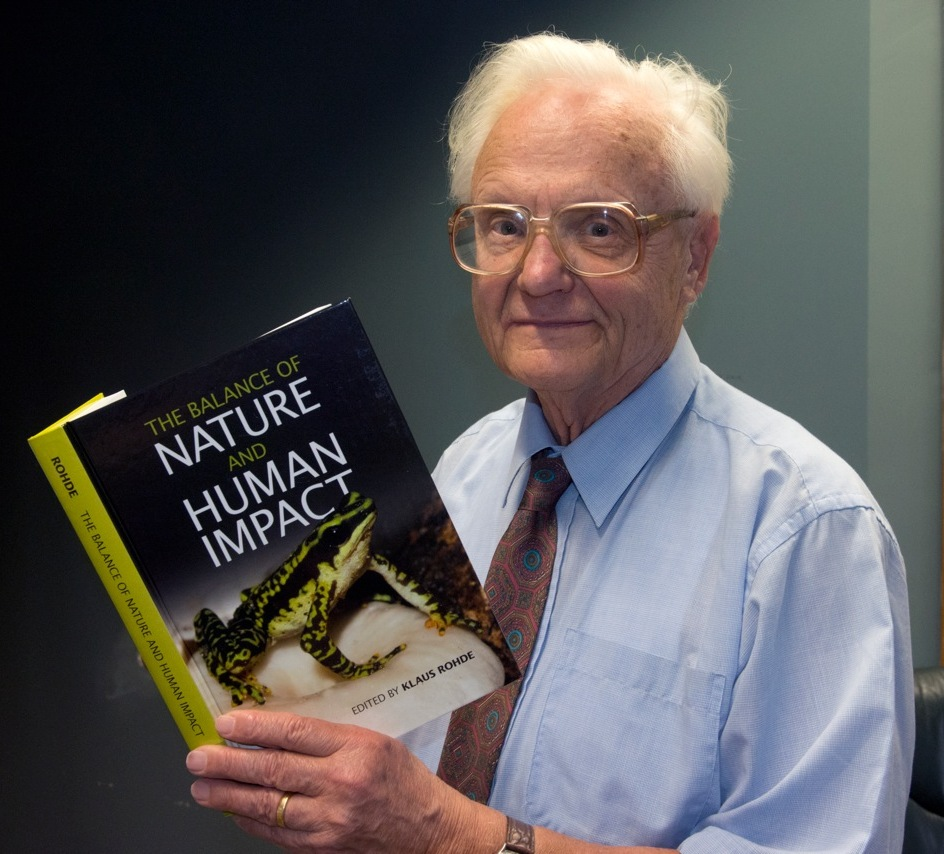
German biologist Klaus Rohde with his book The Balance of Nature and Human Impact.

Despite being discredited among ecologists, the theory is widely held to be true by the general public, conservationists and environmentalists, with one author calling it an "enduring myth". Environmental and conservation organizations such as the WWF, Sierra Club and Canadian Wildlife Federation continue to promote the theory, as do animal rights organizations such as PETA.

Kim Cuddington considers the balance of nature to be a "foundational metaphor in ecology", which is still in active use by ecologists. She argues that many ecologists see nature as a "beneficent force" and that they also view the universe as being innately predictable; Cuddington asserts that the balance of nature acts as a "shorthand for the paradigm expressing this worldview". Douglas Allchin and Alexander J. Werth assert that although "ecologists formally eschew the concept of balance of nature, it remains a widely adopted preconception and a feature of language that seems not to disappear entirely."

At least in Midwestern America, the balance of nature idea was shown to be widely held by both science majors and the general student population. In a study at the University of Patras, educational sciences students were asked to reason about the future of ecosystems which suffered human-driven disturbances. Subjects agreed that it was very likely for the ecosystems to fully recover their initial state, referring to either a 'recovery process' which restores the initial 'balance', or specific 'recovery mechanisms' as an ecosystem's inherent characteristic. In a 2017 study, Ampatzidis and Ergazaki discuss the learning objectives and design criteria that a learning environment for non-biology major students should meet to support them challenge the balance of nature concept. In a 2018 study, the same authors report on the theoretical output of a design research study, which concerns the design of a learning environment for helping students challenge their beliefs regarding the balance of nature and reach an up-to-date understanding about ecosystems' contingency.

== In popular culture ==
In Ursula K. Le Guin's Earthsea fantasy series, using magic means to "respect and preserve the immanent metaphysical balance of nature."

The balance of nature (referred to as "the circle of life") is a major theme of the 1994 film, The Lion King. In one scene, the character Mufasa describes to his son Simba how everything exists in a state of delicate balance.

The character Agent Smith, in the 1999 film The Matrix, describes humanity as a virus, claiming that humans fail to reach an equilibrium with their surrounding environment; unlike other mammals.

The disruption of the balance of nature is a common theme in Hayao Miyazaki's films: Nausicaä of the Valley of the Wind, released in 1984, is set in a post-apocalyptic world where humans have upset the balance of nature through war; the 1997 film Princess Mononoke, depicts irresponsible activities by humans as having damaged the balance of nature; in the 2008 film Ponyo, the titular character disturbs the balance of nature when she seeks to become human.

The titular character of the 2014 film Godzilla fights other sea monsters known as "MUTOs" in a bid to restore the balance of nature.

In the 2018 film Avengers: Infinity War, the villain Thanos seeks to restore the balance of nature by eliminating half of the beings in the universe.

== See also ==
- Ecological footprint
- Social metabolism
