= Ecological niche =

Concept in ecology

In ecology, a niche refers to the specific environmental condition occupied by a species or population. Different definitions have been proposed for the ecological niche, though they mainly revolve around describing the relationship between a species or population and its environment.

The term was coined in 1910 by Roswell Hill Johnson, but the first conceptual work done in the context of ecology research was by Joseph Grinnell in 1917. A Grinnellian niche is determined by the habitat in which a species lives and its accompanying behavioral adaptations. In 1927, Charles Sutherland Elton provided another definition for the ecological niche.The Eltonian niche differs from Grinnell's definition by emphasizing the role that a species plays in its biotic environment, its relationship to the ecosystem, and its use of resources. In 1957, G. Evelyn Hutchinson coined the Hutchinsonian niche as the set of environmental variables and their ranges over which a species can persist. Contemporary conceptions of the ecological niche attempt to reconcile these different definitions; however, differences in interpretation continue.

Ecological niches are an important concept in ecology research aiming to understand species diversity and coexistence. In contemporary niche theory, species with overlapping niches should compete with the superior competitor eliminating the inferior competitor. Species coexistence under this framework requires differences in two species' ecological niches.

The concept of the ecological niche is central to ecological biogeography, which focuses on spatial patterns of ecological communities.

== Grinnellian niche ==
The ecological meaning of niche comes from the meaning of niche as a recess in a wall for a statue, which itself is probably derived from the Middle French word nicher, meaning to nest. The term was coined by the naturalist Roswell Hill Johnson but Joseph Grinnell was probably the first to use it in a research program in 1917, in his paper "The niche relationships of the California Thrasher".

The Grinnellian niche concept embodies the idea that the niche of a species is determined by the habitat in which it lives and its accompanying behavioral adaptations. In other words, the niche is the sum of the habitat requirements and behaviors that allow a species to persist and produce offspring. For example, the behavior of the California thrasher is consistent with the chaparral habitat it lives in—it breeds and feeds in the underbrush and escapes from its predators by shuffling from underbrush to underbrush. Its 'niche' is defined by the felicitous complementing of the thrasher's behavior and physical traits (camouflaging color, short wings, strong legs) with this habitat.

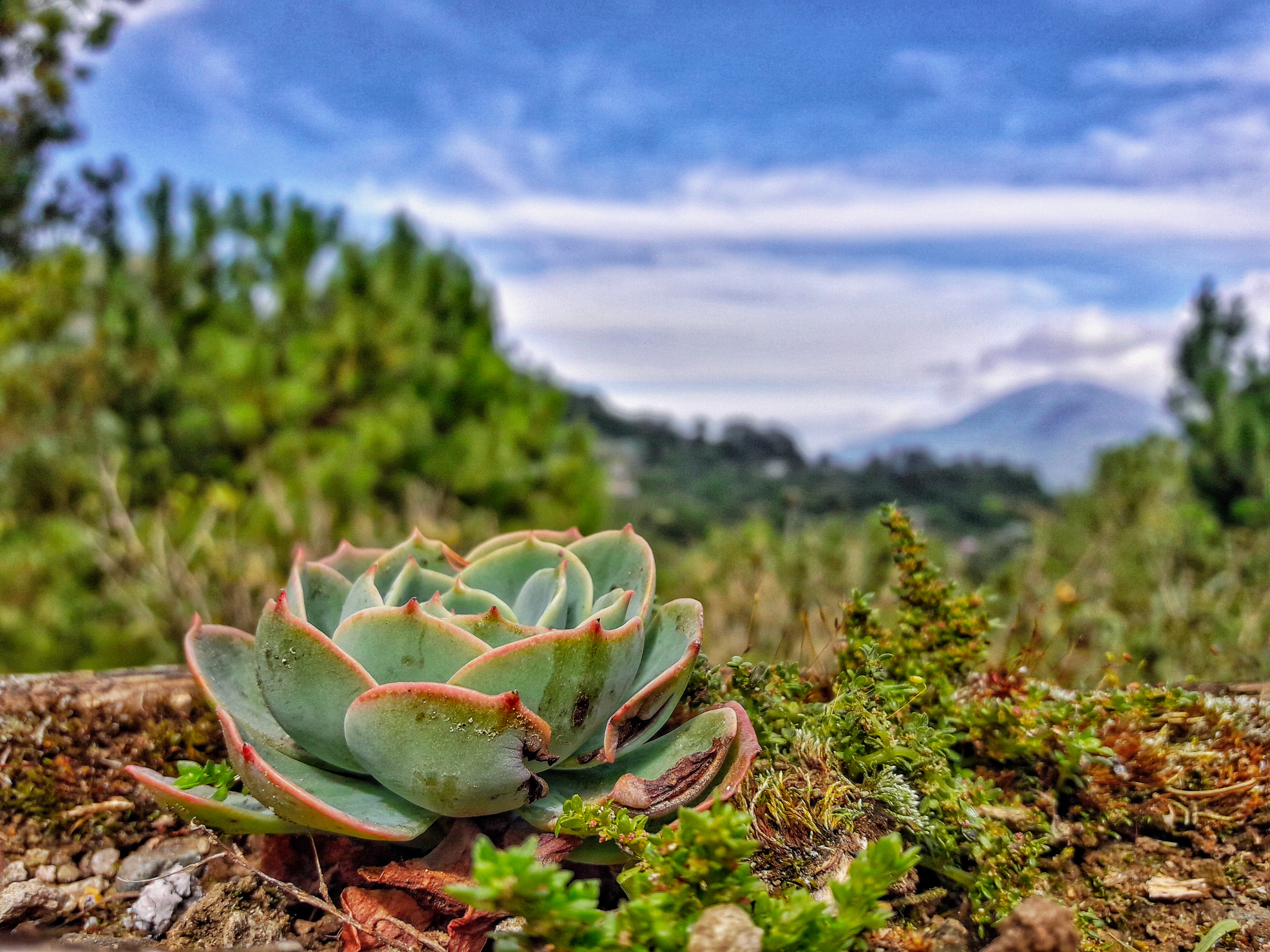
The Grinnellian niche can be described as the "needs" niche, or an area that meets the environmental requirements for an organism's survival. Most succulents are native in dry, arid regions like deserts and require large quantities of sun exposure.

Grinnellian niches can be defined by non-interactive (abiotic) variables and environmental conditions on broad scales. Variables of interest in this niche class include average temperature, precipitation, solar radiation, and terrain aspect which have become increasingly accessible across spatial scales. Most literature has focused on Grinnellian niche constructs, often from a climatic perspective, to explain distribution and abundance. Current predictions on species responses to climate change strongly rely on projecting altered environmental conditions on species distributions. However, it is increasingly acknowledged that climate change also influences species interactions and an Eltonian perspective may be advantageous in explaining these processes.

This perspective of niche allows for the existence of both ecological equivalents and empty niches. An ecological equivalent to an organism is an organism from a different taxonomic group exhibiting similar adaptations in a similar habitat, an example being the different succulents found in American and African deserts, cactus and euphorbia, respectively. As another example, the anole lizards of the Greater Antilles are a rare example of convergent evolution, adaptive radiation, and the existence of ecological equivalents: the anole lizards evolved in similar microhabitats independently of each other and resulted in the same ecomorphs across all four islands.

== Eltonian niche ==
In 1927 Charles Sutherland Elton, a British ecologist, defined a niche as follows: "The 'niche' of an animal means its place in the biotic environment, its relations to food and enemies."

Elton classified niches according to foraging activities ("food habits"):

For instance there is the niche that is filled by birds of prey which eat small animals such as shrews and mice. In an oak wood this niche is filled by tawny owls, while in the open grassland it is occupied by kestrels. The existence of this carnivore niche is dependent on the further fact that mice form a definite herbivore niche in many different associations, although the actual species of mice may be quite different.

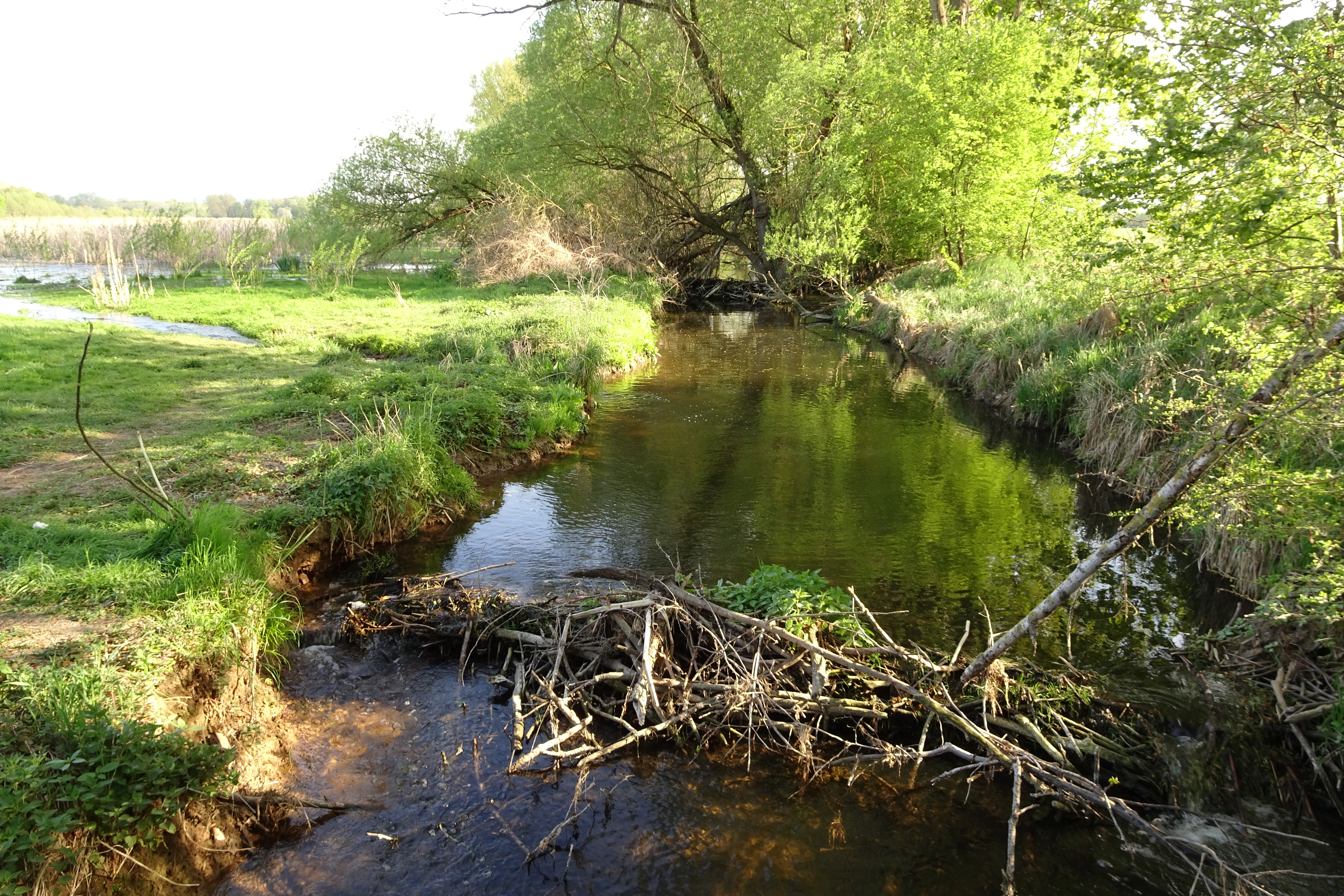
Beaver dam in Hesse, Germany. By exploiting the resource of available wood, beavers are affecting biotic conditions for other species that live within their habitat.

Conceptually, the Eltonian niche introduces the idea of a species' response to and effect on the environment. Unlike other niche concepts, it emphasizes that a species not only grows in and responds to an environment based on available resources, predators, and climatic conditions, but also changes the availability and behavior of those factors as it grows. In an extreme example, beavers require certain resources in order to survive and reproduce, but also construct dams that alter water flow in the river where the beaver lives. Thus, the beaver affects the biotic and abiotic conditions of other species that live in and near the watershed. In a more subtle case, competitors that consume resources at different rates can lead to cycles in resource density that differ between species. Not only do species grow differently with respect to resource density, but their own population growth can affect resource density over time.

Eltonian niches focus on biotic interactions and consumer–resource dynamics (biotic variables) on local scales. Because of the narrow extent of focus, data sets characterizing Eltonian niches typically are in the form of detailed field studies of specific individual phenomena, as the dynamics of this class of niche are difficult to measure at a broad geographic scale. However, the Eltonian niche may be useful in the explanation of a species' endurance of global change. Because adjustments in biotic interactions inevitably change abiotic factors, Eltonian niches can be useful in describing the overall response of a species to new environments.

== Hutchinsonian niche ==
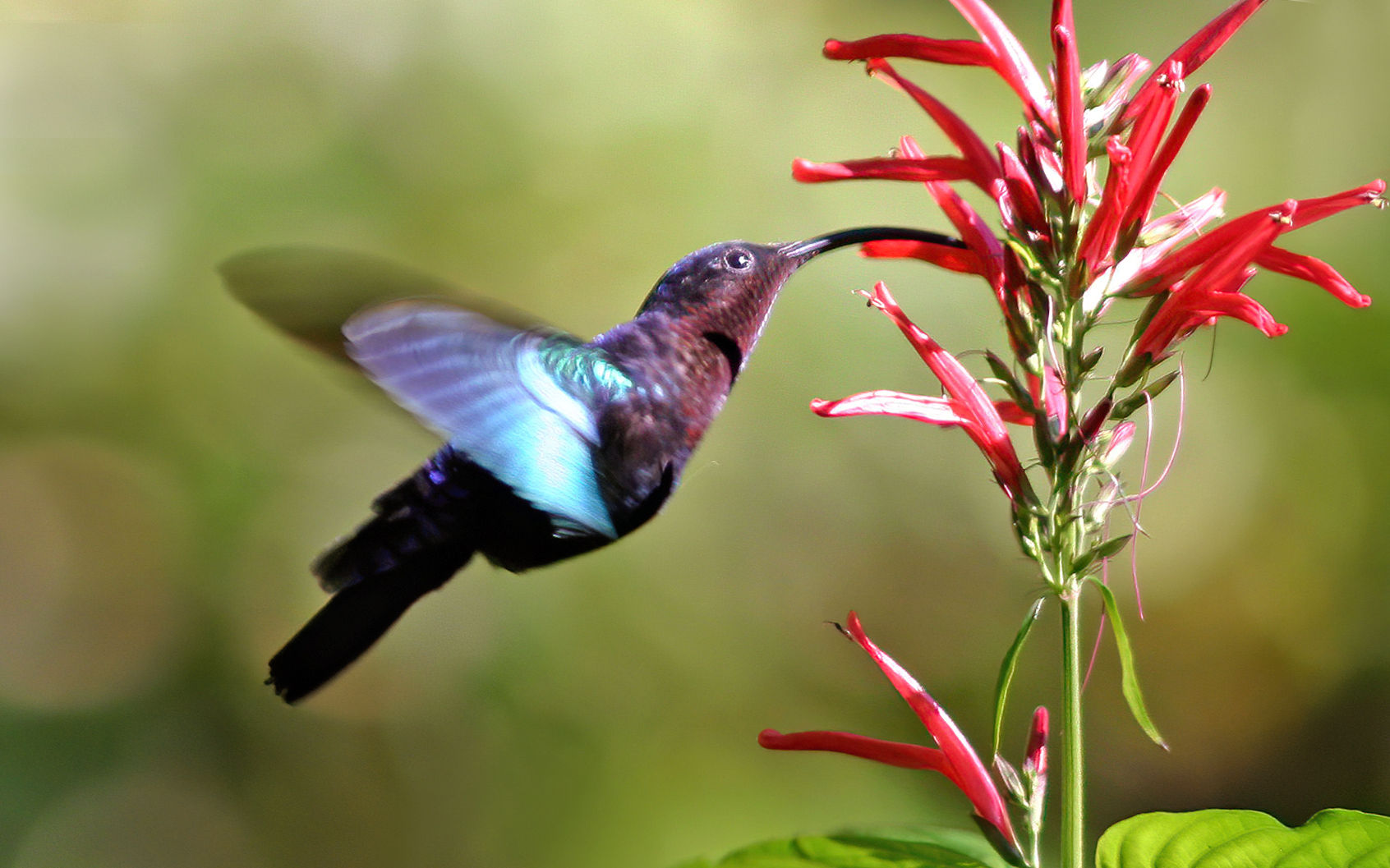
The shape of the bill of this purple-throated carib is complementary to the shape of the flower and coevolved with it, enabling it to exploit the nectar as a resource.

The Hutchinsonian niche is an "n-dimensional hypervolume", where the dimensions are environmental conditions and resources, that define the requirements of an individual or a species to practice its way of life, more particularly, for its population to persist. The "hypervolume" defines the multi-dimensional space of resources (e.g., light, nutrients, structure, etc.) available to (and specifically used by) organisms, and "all species other than those under consideration are regarded as part of the coordinate system."

The niche concept was popularized by the zoologist G. Evelyn Hutchinson in 1957. Hutchinson inquired into the question of why there are so many types of organisms in any one habitat. His work inspired many others to develop models to explain how many and how similar coexisting species could be within a given community, and led to the concepts of 'niche breadth' (the variety of resources or habitats used by a given species), 'niche partitioning' (resource differentiation by coexisting species), and 'niche overlap' (overlap of resource use by different species).

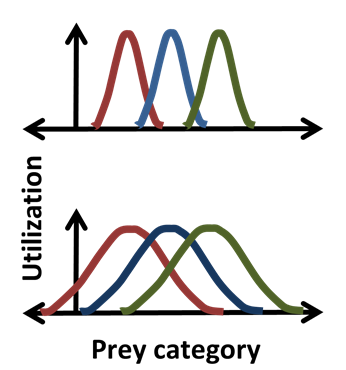
Where three species eat some of the same prey, a statistical picture of each niche shows overlap in resource usage between three species, indicating where competition is strongest.

Statistics were introduced into the Hutchinson niche by Robert MacArthur and Richard Levins using the 'resource-utilization' niche employing histograms to describe the 'frequency of occurrence' as a function of a Hutchinson coordinate. So, for instance, a Gaussian might describe the frequency with which a species ate prey of a certain size, giving a more detailed niche description than simply specifying some median or average prey size. For such a bell-shaped distribution, the position, width and form of the niche correspond to the mean, standard deviation and the actual distribution itself. One advantage in using statistics is illustrated in the figure, where it is clear that for the narrower distributions (top) there is no competition for prey between the extreme left and extreme right species, while for the broader distribution (bottom), niche overlap indicates competition can occur between all species. The resource-utilization approach postulates that not only can competition occur, but that it does occur, and that overlap in resource utilization directly enables the estimation of the competition coefficients. This postulate, however, can be misguided, as it ignores the impacts that the resources of each category have on the organism and the impacts that the organism has on the resources of each category. For instance, the resource in the overlap region can be non-limiting, in which case there is no competition for this resource despite niche overlap.

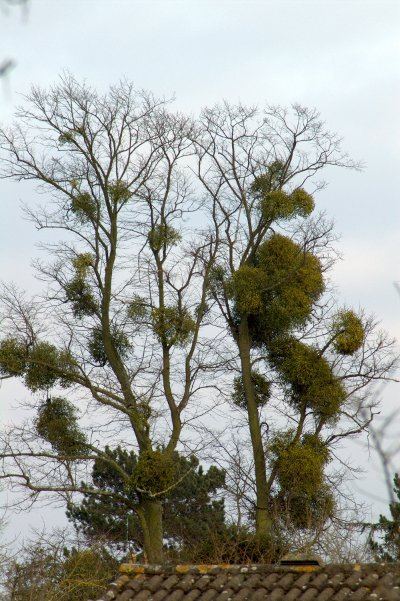
As a hemi-parasitic plant, the mistletoe in this tree exploits its host for nutrients and as a place to grow.

An organism free of interference from other species could use the full range of conditions (biotic and abiotic) and resources in which it could survive and reproduce which is called its fundamental niche. However, as a result of pressure from, and interactions with, other organisms (i.e. inter-specific competition) species are usually forced to occupy a niche that is narrower than this, and to which they are mostly highly adapted; this is termed the realized niche. Hutchinson used the idea of competition for resources as the primary mechanism driving ecology, but overemphasis upon this focus has proved to be a handicap for the niche concept. In particular, overemphasis upon a species' dependence upon resources has led to too little emphasis upon the effects of organisms on their environment, for instance, colonization and invasions.

The term "adaptive zone" was coined by the paleontologist George Gaylord Simpson to explain how a population could jump from one niche to another that suited it, jump to an 'adaptive zone', made available by virtue of some modification, or possibly a change in the food chain, that made the adaptive zone available to it without a discontinuity in its way of life because the group was 'pre-adapted' to the new ecological opportunity.

Hutchinson's "niche" (a description of the ecological space occupied by a species) is subtly different from the "niche" as defined by Grinnell (an ecological role, that may or may not be actually filled by a species—see vacant niches).

A niche is a very specific segment of ecospace occupied by a single species. On the presumption that no two species are identical in all respects (called Hardin's 'axiom of inequality') and the competitive exclusion principle, some resource or adaptive dimension will provide a niche specific to each species. Species can however share a 'mode of life' or 'autecological strategy' which are broader definitions of ecospace. For example, Australian grasslands species, though different from those of the Great Plains grasslands, exhibit similar modes of life.

Once a niche is left vacant, other organisms can fill that position. For example, the niche that was left vacant by the extinction of the tarpan has been filled by other animals (in particular a small horse breed, the konik). Also, when plants and animals are introduced into a new environment, they have the potential to occupy or invade the niche or niches of native organisms, often outcompeting the indigenous species. Introduction of non-indigenous species to non-native habitats by humans often results in biological pollution by the exotic or invasive species.

The mathematical representation of a species' fundamental niche in ecological space, and its subsequent projection back into geographic space, is the domain of niche modelling.

== Contemporary niche theory ==
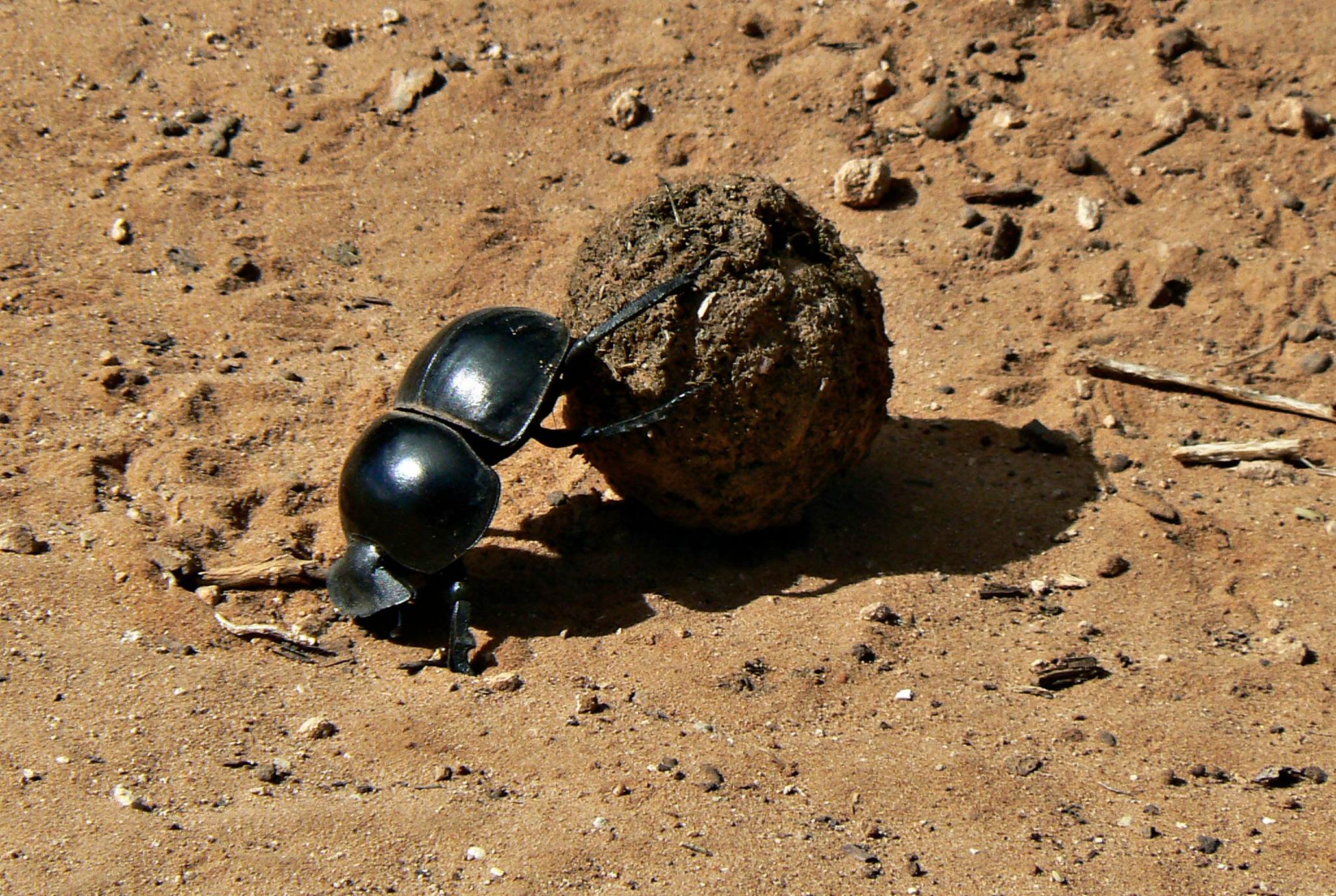
The flightless dung beetle occupies an ecological niche: exploiting animal droppings as a food source.

Contemporary niche theory (also called "classic niche theory" in some contexts) is a framework that was originally designed to reconcile different definitions of niches (see Grinnellian, Eltonian, and Hutchinsonian definitions above), and to help explain the underlying processes that affect Lotka–Volterra relationships within an ecosystem. The framework centers around "consumer-resource models" which largely split a given ecosystem into resources (e.g. sunlight or available water in soil) and consumers (e.g. any living thing, including plants and animals), and attempts to define the scope of possible relationships that could exist between the two groups.

In contemporary niche theory, the "impact niche" is defined as the combination of effects that a given consumer has on both a). the resources that it uses, and b). the other consumers in the ecosystem. Therefore, the impact niche is equivalent to the Eltonian niche since both concepts are defined by the impact of a given species on its environment.

The range of environmental conditions where a species can successfully survive and reproduce (i.e. the Hutchinsonian definition of a realized niche) is also encompassed under contemporary niche theory, termed the "requirement niche". The requirement niche is bounded by both the availability of resources as well as the effects of coexisting consumers (e.g. competitors and predators).

=== Coexistence under contemporary niche theory ===
Contemporary niche theory provides three requirements that must be met in order for two species (consumers) to coexist:

1. The requirement niches of both consumers must overlap.
2. Each consumer must outcompete the other for the resource that it needs most. For example, if two plants (P1 and P2) are competing for nitrogen and phosphorus in a given ecosystem, they will only coexist if they are limited by different resources (P1 is limited by nitrogen and P2 is limited by phosphorus, perhaps) and each species must outcompete the other species to get that resource (P1 needs to be better at obtaining nitrogen and P2 needs to be better at obtaining phosphorus). Intuitively, this makes sense from an inverse perspective: If both consumers are limited by the same resource, one of the species will ultimately be the better competitor, and only that species will survive. Furthermore, if P1 was outcompeted for the nitrogen (the resource it needed most) it would not survive. Likewise, if P2 was outcompeted for phosphorus, it would not survive.
3. The availability of the limiting resources (nitrogen and phosphorus in the above example) in the environment are equivalent.

These requirements are interesting and controversial because they require any two species to share a certain environment (have overlapping requirement niches) but fundamentally differ the ways that they use (or "impact") that environment. These requirements have repeatedly been violated by nonnative (i.e. introduced and invasive) species, which often coexist with new species in their nonnative ranges, but do not appear to be constricted these requirements. In other words, contemporary niche theory predicts that species will be unable to invade new environments outside of their requirement (i.e. realized) niche, yet many examples of this are well-documented. Additionally, contemporary niche theory predicts that species will be unable to establish in environments where other species already consume resources in the same ways as the incoming species, however examples of this are also numerous.

== Niche differentiation ==
In ecology, niche differentiation (also known as niche segregation, niche separation and niche partitioning) refers to the process by which competing species use the environment differently in a way that helps them to coexist. The competitive exclusion principle states that if two species with identical niches (ecological roles) compete, then one will inevitably drive the other to extinction. This rule also states that two species cannot occupy the same exact niche in a habitat and coexist together, at least in a stable manner. When two species differentiate their niches, they tend to compete less strongly, and are thus more likely to coexist. Species can differentiate their niches in many ways, such as by consuming different foods, or using different areas of the environment.

As an example of niche partitioning, several anole lizards in the Caribbean islands share common diets—mainly insects. They avoid competition by occupying different physical locations. Although these lizards might occupy different locations, some species can be found inhabiting the same range, with up to 15 in certain areas. For example, some live on the ground while others are arboreal. Species who live in different areas compete less for food and other resources, which minimizes competition between species. However, species who live in similar areas typically compete with each other.

=== Detection and quantification ===
The Lotka–Volterra equation states that two competing species can coexist when intra-specific (within species) competition is greater than inter-specific (between species) competition. Since niche differentiation concentrates competition within-species, due to a decrease in between-species competition, the Lotka-Volterra model predicts that niche differentiation of any degree will result in coexistence.

In reality, this still leaves the question of how much differentiation is needed for coexistence. A vague answer to this question is that the more similar two species are, the more finely balanced the suitability of their environment must be in order to allow coexistence. There are limits to the amount of niche differentiation required for coexistence, and this can vary with the type of resource, the nature of the environment, and the amount of variation both within and between the species.

To answer questions about niche differentiation, it is necessary for ecologists to be able to detect, measure, and quantify the niches of different coexisting and competing species. This is often done through a combination of detailed ecological studies, controlled experiments (to determine the strength of competition), and mathematical models. To understand the mechanisms of niche differentiation and competition, much data must be gathered on how the two species interact, how they use their resources, and the type of ecosystem in which they exist, among other factors. In addition, several mathematical models exist to quantify niche breadth, competition, and coexistence (Bastolla et al. 2005). However, regardless of methods used, niches and competition can be distinctly difficult to measure quantitatively, and this makes detection and demonstration of niche differentiation difficult and complex.

=== Development ===
Over time, two competing species can either coexist, through niche differentiation or other means, or compete until one species becomes locally extinct. Several theories exist for how niche differentiation arises or evolves given these two possible outcomes.

==== Current competition (The Ghost of Competition Present) ====
Niche differentiation can arise from current competition. For instance, species X has a fundamental niche of the entire slope of a hillside, but its realized niche is only the top portion of the slope because species Y, which is a better competitor but cannot survive on the top portion of the slope, has excluded it from the lower portion of the slope. With this scenario, competition will continue indefinitely in the middle of the slope between these two species. Because of this, detection of the presence of niche differentiation (through competition) will be relatively easy. Importantly, there is no evolutionary change of the individual species in this case; rather this is an ecological effect of species Y out-competing species X within the bounds of species Y's fundamental niche.

==== Via past extinctions (The Ghost of Competition Past) ====
Another way by which niche differentiation can arise is via the previous elimination of species without realized niches. This asserts that at some point in the past, several species inhabited an area, and all of these species had overlapping fundamental niches. However, through competitive exclusion, the less competitive species were eliminated, leaving only the species that were able to coexist (i.e. the most competitive species whose realized niches did not overlap). Again, this process does not include any evolutionary change of individual species, but it is merely the product of the competitive exclusion principle. Also, because no species is out-competing any other species in the final community, the presence of niche differentiation will be difficult or impossible to detect.

==== Evolving differences ====
Finally, niche differentiation can arise as an evolutionary effect of competition. In this case, two competing species will evolve different patterns of resource use so as to avoid competition. Here too, current competition is absent or low, and therefore detection of niche differentiation is difficult or impossible.

=== Types ===
Below is a list of ways that species can partition their niche. This list is not exhaustive, but illustrates several classic examples.

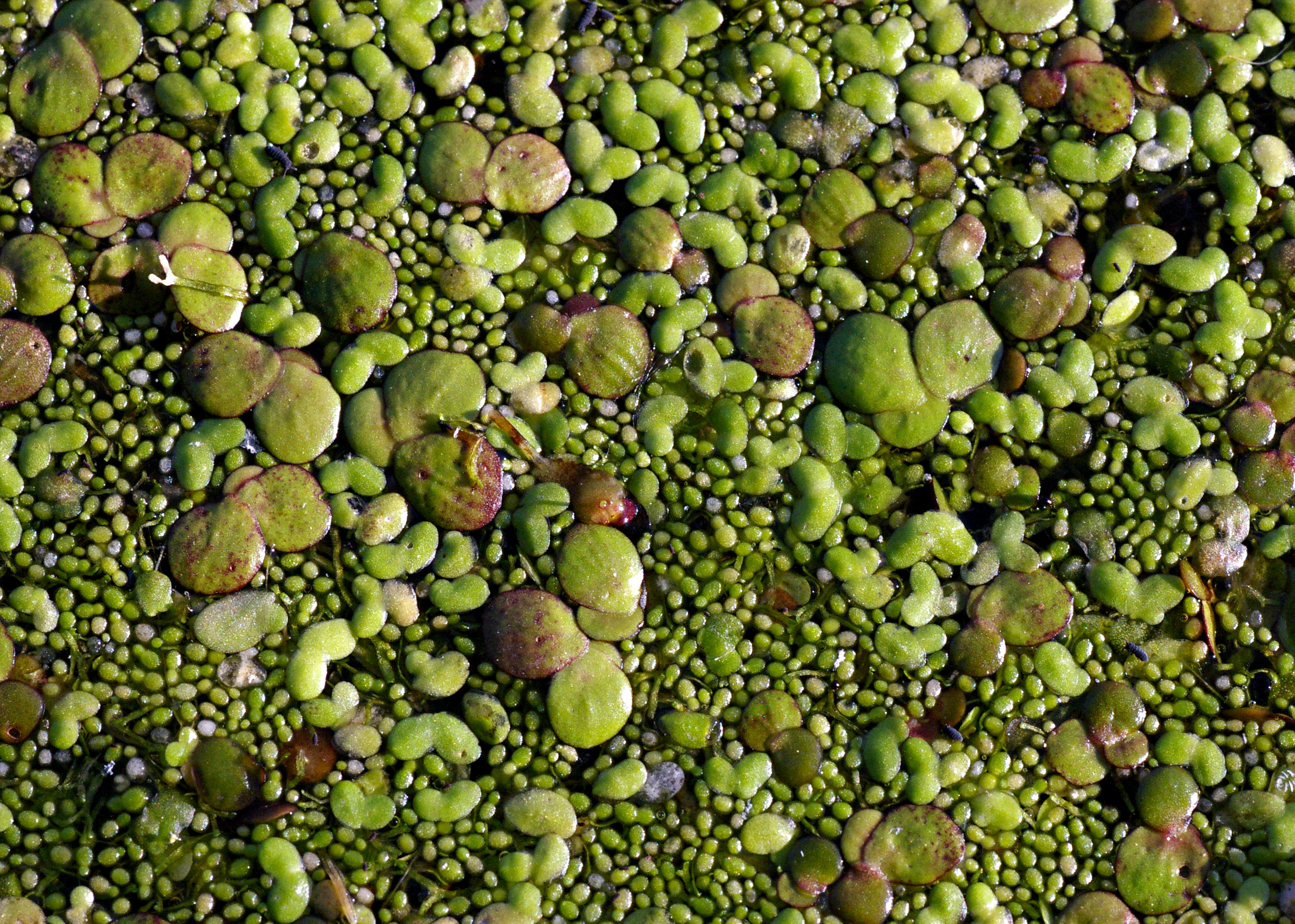
Duckweed on a pond. Niche differentiation by size: greater duckweed, lesser duckweed and rootless dwarf duckweed

==== Resource partitioning ====
Resource partitioning is the phenomenon where two or more species divides out resources like food, space, resting sites etc. to coexist. For example, some lizard species appear to coexist because they consume insects of differing sizes. Alternatively, species can coexist on the same resources if each species is limited by different resources, or differently able to capture resources. Different types of phytoplankton can coexist when different species are differently limited by nitrogen, phosphorus, silicon, and light. In the Galapagos Islands, finches with small beaks are more able to consume small seeds, and finches with large beaks are more able to consume large seeds. If a species' density declines, then the food it most depends on will become more abundant (since there are so few individuals to consume it). As a result, the remaining individuals will experience less competition for food.

Although "resource" generally refers to food, species can partition other non-consumable objects, such as parts of the habitat. For example, warblers are thought to coexist because they nest in different parts of trees. Species can also partition habitat in a way that gives them access to different types of resources. As stated in the introduction, anole lizards appear to coexist because each uses different parts of the forests as perch locations. This likely gives them access to different species of insects as well.

Research has determined that plants can recognize each other's root systems and differentiate between a clone, a plant grown from the same mother plants seeds, and other species. Based on the root secretions, also called exudates, plants can make this determination. The communication between plants starts with the secretions from plant roots into the rhizosphere. If another plant that is kin is entering this area the plant will take up exudates. The exudate, being several different compounds, will enter the plants root cell and attach to a receptor for that chemical halting growth of the root meristem in that direction, if the interaction is kin.

Simonsen discusses how plants accomplish root communication with the addition of beneficial rhizobia and fungal networks and the potential for different genotypes of the kin plants, such as the legume M. Lupulina, and specific strains of nitrogen fixing bacteria and rhizomes can alter relationships between kin and non-kin competition. This means there could be specific subsets of genotypes in kin plants that selects well with specific strains that could outcompete other kin. What might seem like an instance in kin competition could just be different genotypes of organisms at play in the soil that increase the symbiotic efficiency.

==== Predator partitioning ====
Predator partitioning occurs when species are attacked differently by different predators (or natural enemies more generally). For example, trees could differentiate their niche if they are consumed by different species of specialist herbivores, such as herbivorous insects. If a species density declines, so too will the density of its natural enemies, giving it an advantage. Thus, if each species is constrained by different natural enemies, they will be able to coexist. Early work focused on specialist predators; however, more recent studies have shown that predators do not need to be pure specialists, they simply need to affect each prey species differently. The Janzen–Connell hypothesis represents a form of predator partitioning.

==== Conditional differentiation ====
Conditional differentiation (sometimes called temporal niche partitioning) occurs when species differ in their competitive abilities based on varying environmental conditions. For example, in the Sonoran Desert, some annual plants are more successful during wet years, while others are more successful during dry years. As a result, each species will have an advantage in some years, but not others. When environmental conditions are most favorable, individuals will tend to compete most strongly with members of the same species. For example, in a dry year, dry-adapted plants will tend to be most limited by other dry-adapted plants. This can help them to coexist through a storage effect.

==== Competition-predation trade-off ====
Species can differentiate their niche via a competition-predation trade-off if one species is a better competitor when predators are absent, and the other is better when predators are present. Defenses against predators, such as toxic compounds or hard shells, are often metabolically costly. As a result, species that produce such defenses are often poor competitors when predators are absent. Species can coexist through a competition-predation trade-off if predators are more abundant when the less defended species is common, and less abundant if the well-defended species is common. This effect has been criticized as being weak, because theoretical models suggest that only two species within a community can coexist because of this mechanism.

== Segregation versus restriction ==
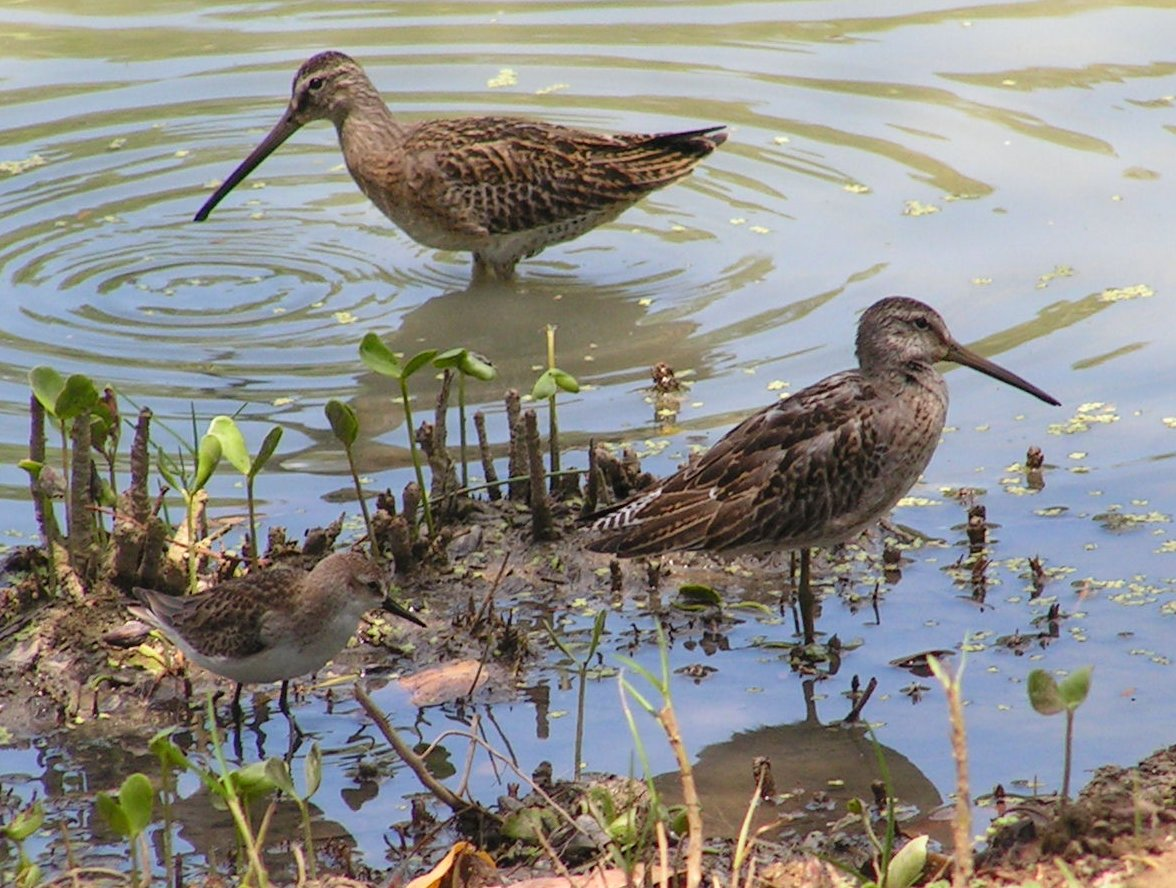
Shorebirds with long legs and long bills, such as these two dowitchers, can feed in slightly deeper water than the semipalmated sandpiper at the water's edge (lower left)

Two ecological paradigms deal with the problem. The first paradigm predominates in what may be called "classical" ecology. It assumes that niche space is largely saturated with individuals and species, leading to strong competition. Niches are restricted because "neighbouring" species, i.e., species with similar ecological characteristics such as similar habitats or food preferences, prevent expansion into other niches or even narrow niches down. This continual struggle for existence is an important assumption of natural selection introduced by Darwin as an explanation for evolution.

The other paradigm assumes that niche space is to a large degree vacant, i.e., that there are many vacant niches. It is based on many empirical studies and theoretical investigations especially of Kauffman 1993. Causes of vacant niches may be evolutionary contingencies or brief or long-lasting environmental disturbances.

Both paradigms agree that species are never "universal" in the sense that they occupy all possible niches; they are always specialized, although the degree of specialization varies. For example, there is no universal parasite which infects all host species and microhabitats within or on them. However, the degree of host specificity varies strongly. Thus, Toxoplasma (Protista) infects numerous vertebrates including humans, Enterobius vermicularis infects only humans.

The following mechanisms for niche restriction and segregation have been proposed:

Niche restriction:

1. Species must be specialized in order to survive. They may survive for a while in less optimal habitats under favourable conditions, but they will be extinguished when conditions become less favourable, for example due to changed weather conditions (this aspect was especially emphasized by Price 1983).
2. Niches remain narrow or become narrower as the result of natural selection in order to enhance the chances of mating. This "mating theory of niche restriction" is supported by the observation that niches of asexual stages are often wider than those of sexually mature stages; that niches become narrower at the time of mating; and that microhabitats of sessile species and of species with small population sizes often are narrower than those of non-sessile species and of species with large population sizes.

Niche segregation:

1. The random selection of niches in largely empty niche space will often automatically lead to segregation (this mechanism is of particular importance in the second paradigm).
2. Niches are segregated due to interspecific competition (this mechanism is of particular importance in the first paradigm).
3. Niches of similar species are segregated (as the result of natural selection) in order to prevent interspecific hybridisation, because hybrids are less fit. (Many cases of niche segregation explained by interspecific competition are better explained by this mechanism, i.e., "reinforcement of reproductive barriers") (e.g., Rohde 2005b).

=== Relative significance of the mechanisms ===
Both paradigms acknowledge a role for all mechanisms (except possibly for that of random selection of niches in the first paradigm), but emphasis on the various mechanisms varies. The first paradigm stresses the paramount importance of interspecific competition, whereas the second paradigm tries to explain many cases which are thought to be due to competition in the first paradigm, by reinforcement of reproductive barriers and/or random selection of niches. – Many authors believe in the overriding importance of interspecific competition. Intuitively, one would expect that interspecific competition is of particular importance in all those cases in which sympatric species (i.e., species occurring together in the same area) with large population densities use the same resources and largely exhaust them. However, Andrewartha and Birch (1954,1984) and others have pointed out that most natural populations usually don't even approach exhaustion of resources, and too much emphasis on interspecific competition is therefore wrong. Concerning the possibility that competition has led to segregation in the evolutionary past, Wiens (1974, 1984) concluded that such assumptions cannot be proven, and Connell (1980) found that interspecific competition as a mechanism of niche segregation has been proven only for some pest insects. Barker (1983), in his review of competition in Drosophila and related genera, which are among the best known animal groups, concluded that the idea of niche segregation by interspecific competition is attractive, but that no study has yet been able to show a mechanism responsible for segregation. Without specific evidence, the possibility of random segregation can never be excluded, and assumption of such randomness can indeed serve as a null-model. – Many physiological and morphological differences between species can prevent hybridization. Evidence for niche segregation as the result of reinforcement of reproductive barriers is especially convincing in those cases in which such differences are not found in allopatric but only in sympatric locations. For example, Kawano (2002) has shown this for giant rhinoceros beetles in Southeast Asia. Two closely related species occur in 12 allopatric (i.e., in different areas) and 7 sympatric (i.e., in the same area) locations. In the former, body length and length of genitalia are practically identical, in the latter, they are significantly different, and much more so for the genitalia than the body, convincing evidence that reinforcement is an important factor (and possibly the only one) responsible for niche segregation. - The very detailed studies of communities of Monogenea parasitic on the gills of marine and freshwater fishes by several authors have shown the same. Species use strictly defined microhabitats and have very complex copulatory organs. This and the fact that fish replicas are available in almost unlimited numbers, makes them ideal ecological models. Many congeners (species belonging to the same genus) and non-congeners were found on single host species. The maximum number of congeners was nine species. The only limiting factor is space for attachment, since food (blood, mucus, fast regenerating epithelial cells) is in unlimited supply as long as the fish is alive. Various authors, using a variety of statistical methods, have consistently found that species with different copulatory organs may co-occur in the same microhabitat, whereas congeners with identical or very similar copulatory organs are spatially segregated, convincing evidence that reinforcement and not competition is responsible for niche segregation.

For a detailed discussion, especially of competition and reinforcement of reproductive barriers, see

== Coexistence without niche differentiation: exceptions to the rule ==
Some competing species have been shown to coexist on the same resource with no observable evidence of niche differentiation and in "violation" of the competitive exclusion principle. One instance is in a group of hispine beetle species. These beetle species, which eat the same food and occupy the same habitat, coexist without any evidence of segregation or exclusion. The beetles show no aggression either intra- or inter-specifically. Coexistence may be possible through a combination of non-limiting food and habitat resources and high rates of predation and parasitism, though this has not been demonstrated.

This example illustrates that the evidence for niche differentiation is by no means universal. Niche differentiation is also not the only means by which coexistence is possible between two competing species. However, niche differentiation is a critically important ecological idea which explains species coexistence, thus promoting the high biodiversity often seen in many of the world's biomes.

Research using mathematical modelling is indeed demonstrating that predation can indeed stabilize lumps of very similar species. Willow warbler and chiffchaff and other very similar warblers can serve as an example. The idea is that it is also a good strategy to be very similar to a successful species or have enough dissimilarity. Other examples of nearly identical species clusters occupying the same niche were water beetles, prairie birds and algae. The basic idea is that there can be clusters of very similar species all applying the same successful strategy and between them open spaces. Here the species cluster takes the place of a single species in the classical ecological models.

== Niche and Geographic Range ==
Diagram representation of the effects of competitive exclusion on the barnacle Chthamalus stellatus in the intertidal zone. The fundamental and realized geographic ranges of C. stellatus are represented by the dark blue and light blue bars, respectively. (in Basque)

Graph depicting how a realized niche fits within a fundamental niche depending on varying abiotic factors

The geographic range of a species can be viewed as a spatial reflection of its niche, along with characteristics of the geographic template and the species that influence its potential to colonize. The fundamental geographic range of a species is the area it occupies in which environmental conditions are favorable, without restriction from barriers to disperse or colonize. A species will be confined to its realized geographic range when confronting biotic interactions or abiotic barriers that limit dispersal, a more narrow subset of its larger fundamental geographic range.

An early study on ecological niches conducted by Joseph H. Connell analyzed the environmental factors that limit the range of a barnacle (Chthamalus stellatus) on Scotland's Isle of Cumbrae. In his experiments, Connell described the dominant features of C. stellatus niches and provided explanation for their distribution on intertidal zone of the rocky coast of the Isle. Connell described the upper portion of C. stellatus's range is limited by the barnacle's ability to resist dehydration during periods of low tide. The lower portion of the range was limited by interspecific interactions, namely competition with a cohabiting barnacle species and predation by a snail. By removing the competing B. balanoides, Connell showed that C. stellatus was able to extend the lower edge of its realized niche in the absence of competitive exclusion. These experiments demonstrate how biotic and abiotic factors limit the distribution of an organism.

== Parameters ==
The different dimensions, or plot axes, of a niche represent different biotic and abiotic variables. These factors may include descriptions of the organism's life history, habitat, trophic position (place in the food chain), and geographic range. According to the competitive exclusion principle, no two species can occupy the same niche in the same environment for a long time. The parameters of a realized niche are described by the realized niche width of that species. Some plants and animals, called specialists, need specific habitats and surroundings to survive, such as the spotted owl, which lives specifically in old growth forests. Other plants and animals, called generalists, are not as particular and can survive in a range of conditions, for example the dandelion.

== See also ==
- Ontogenetic niche shift
- Marginal distribution (biology)
- Fitness landscape
- Niche differentiation
- Overpopulation
- Phylogenetic niche conservatism
- Unified neutral theory of biodiversity
- Character displacement
