= Seed predation =

Feeding mainly on seeds

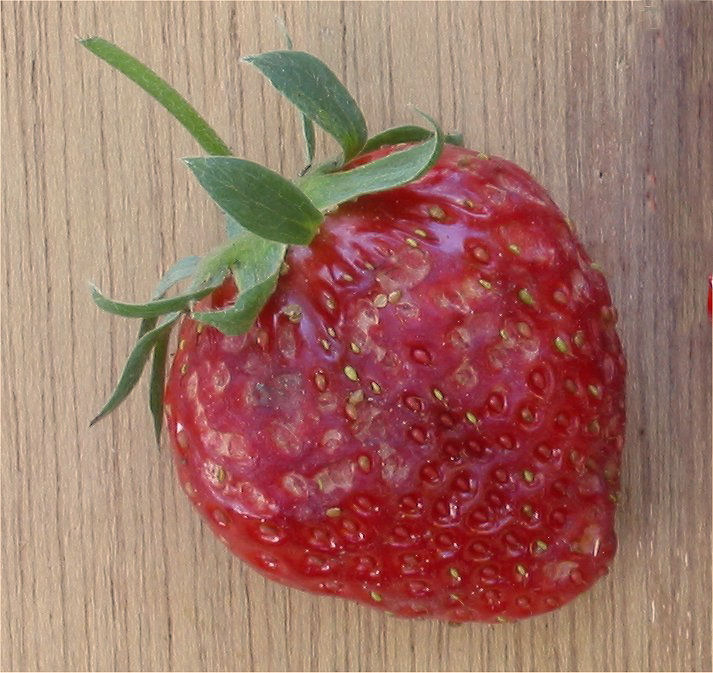
A strawberry damaged by a mouse's eating the small seeds (achenes) on its surface

Seed predation, often also called granivory, is a type of plant-animal interaction in which animals feed mainly on the seeds of plants. Granivores are found across many families of vertebrates, especially mammals and birds, as well as in many groups of insects.

Seed predation is commonly divided into pre-dispersal and post-dispersal predation, which affect the fitness of the parental plant and the dispersed offspring (the seed), respectively. The two types of predation may be mitigated by different strategies. To counter seed predation, plants have evolved both physical (e.g., shape and toughness of the seed coat) and chemical defenses (such as tannins and alkaloids). As plants have evolved seed defenses, seed predators have adapted in response (e.g., becoming able to detoxify chemical compounds). Thus, many examples of coevolution arise from this dynamic relationship.

== Seeds and their defenses ==
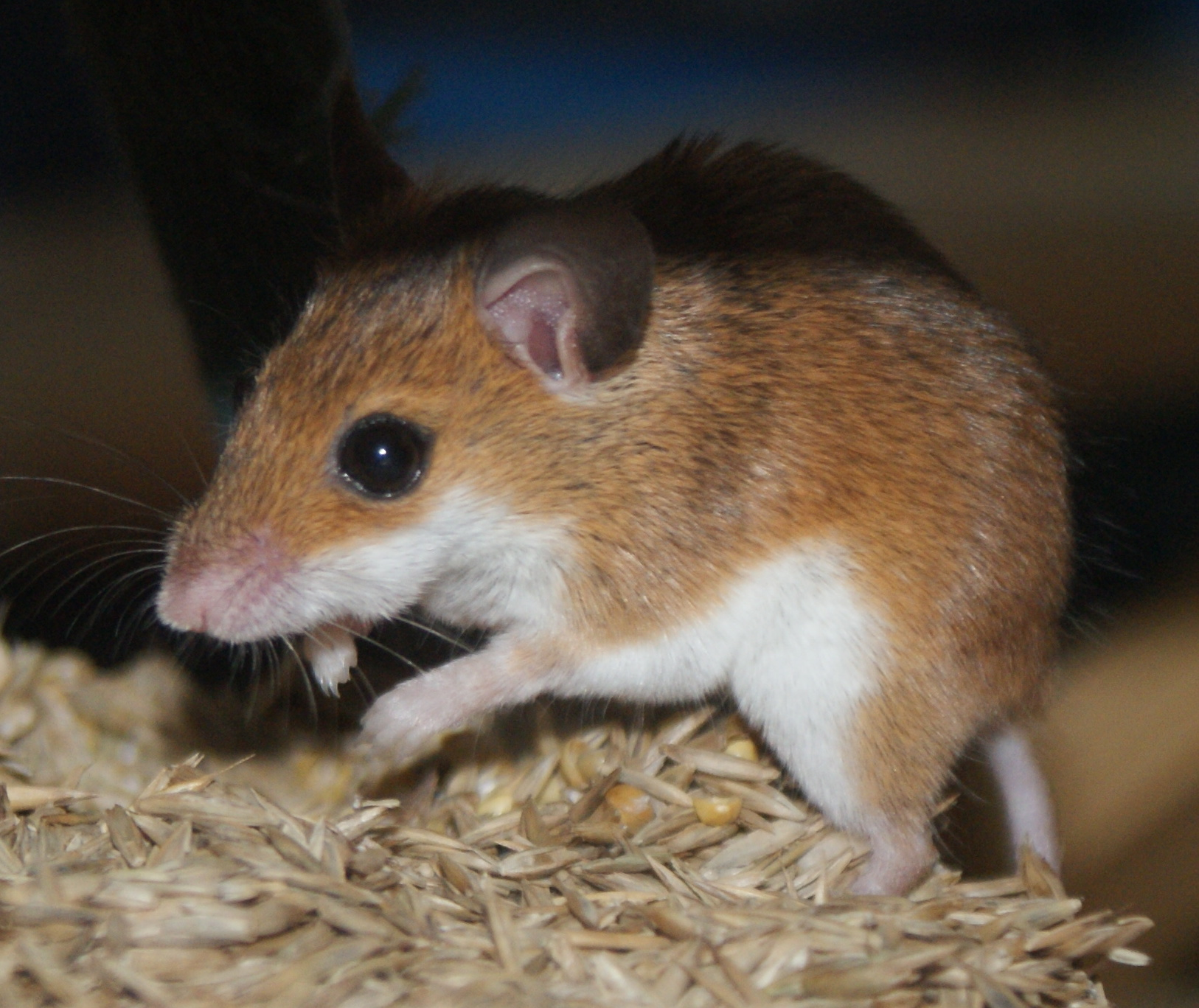
Mouse eating seeds

Plant seeds are important sources of nutrition for animals across most ecosystems. Seeds contain food storage organs (e.g., endosperm) that provide nutrients to the developing plant embryo (cotyledon). This makes seeds an attractive food source for animals because they are a highly concentrated and localized nutrient source in relation to other plant parts.

Seeds of many plants have evolved a variety of defenses to deter predation. Seeds are often contained inside protective structures or fruit pulp that encapsulate seeds until they are ripe. Other physical defenses include spines, hairs, fibrous seed coats and hard endosperm. Seeds, especially in arid areas, may have a mucilaginous seed coat that can glue soil to seed hiding it from granivores.

Some seeds have evolved strong anti-herbivore chemical compounds. In contrast to physical defenses, chemical seed defenses deter consumption using chemicals that are toxic or distasteful to granivores or that inhibit the digestibility of the seed. These chemicals include toxic non-protein amino acids, cyanogenic glycosides, protease and amylase inhibitors, and phytohemagglutinins. Plants may face trade-offs between allocation toward defenses and the size and number of seeds produced.

Plants may reduce the severity of seed predation by making seeds spatially or temporally scarce to granivores. Seed dispersal away from the parent plant is hypothesized to reduce the severity of seed predation. Seed masting is an example of how plant populations are able to temporally regulate the severity of seed predation. Masting refers to a concerted abundance of seed production followed by a period of paucity. This strategy can regulate the size of the population of seed predators.

== Seed predation vs. seed dispersal ==
Adaptations to defend seeds against predation can impact seeds' ability to germinate and disperse. Thus anti-predator adaptations often occur in a suite of adaptations for a particular seed life history. For example, chili plants selectively deter mammal seed predators and fungi using capsaicin, which does not deter bird seed dispersers because bird taste receptors do not bind with capsaicin. Chili seeds in turn have higher survival if they pass through a bird's stomach than if they fall to the ground.

== Pre- and post-dispersal ==
Seed predation can occur both before and after seed dispersal.

=== Pre-dispersal ===
Pre-dispersal seed predation takes place when seeds are removed from the parent plant before dispersal, and it has been most often reported in invertebrates, birds, and in granivorous rodents that clip fruits directly from trees and herbaceous plants. Post-dispersal seed predation arises once seeds have been released from the parent plant. Birds, rodents, and ants are known to be among the most pervasive postdispersal seed predators. Furthermore, postdispersal seed predation can take place at two contrasting stages: predation on the "seed rain" and predation on the "seed bank". Whereas predation on the seed rain occurs when animals prey on released seeds usually flush with the ground surface, predation on the seed bank takes place after seeds have been incorporated deeply into the soil.

=== Post-dispersal ===
Post-dispersal seed predation is extremely common in virtually all ecosystems. Given the heterogeneity in both resource type (seeds from different species), quality (seeds of different ages and/or different status of integrity or decomposition) and location (seeds are scattered and hidden in the environment), most post-dispersal predators have generalist habits. These predators belong to a diverse array of animals, such as ants, beetles, crabs, fish, rodents and birds. The assemblage of post-dispersal seed predators varies considerably among ecosystems.

=== Differences ===
Both pre- and post-dispersal seed predation are common. Pre-dispersal predators differ from post-dispersal predators in most often being specialists, adapted to clustered resources (on the plant). They use specific cues like plant chemistry (volatile compounds), color, and size to locate seeds, and their short life cycles often match the production of seeds by the host plant. Insect groups containing many pre-dispersal seed predators are Coleoptera, Hemiptera, Hymenoptera and Lepidoptera.

== Effects on plant demography ==
The Janzen-Connell model concerns how seed density and survival respond to distance from the parent tree and differential rates of seed predation. Seed density often decreases as distance from the parent tree increases. Where seeds are most abundant under the parent tree, seed predation is predicted to be at its highest. As distance from the parent tree increases, seed abundance and thus seed predation are predicted to decrease as seed survival increases. Seed predation is sometimes powerful enough to limit seedling recruitment and hence the tree population (described as 'seed limited'). In dune habitats seed predators, deer mice, can limit seedling recruitment, but in grassland habitat they had little effect as the plant population was limited instead by the availability of safe sites ('safe site limited'). Seed predators sometimes support plant populations by dispersing seeds away from the parent plant, in effect supporting gene flow between populations. Other seed predators collect seeds and then cache them for later consumption. The hidden seed may be forgotten and then germinate and grow, supporting dispersal.

== See also ==
- Consumer–resource interactions
- Egg predation
- Harvester ant
- Herbivore
- Seed dispersal
