= Latitudinal gradients in species diversity =

Global increase in species richness from polar regions to tropics

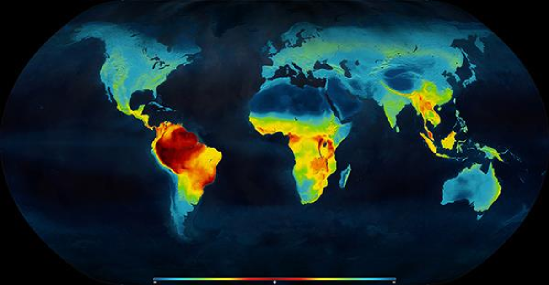
Map latitudinal gradient of living terrestrial vertebrate species richness (Mannion 2014)

Species richness, or biodiversity, increases from the poles to the tropics for a wide variety of terrestrial and marine organisms, often referred to as the latitudinal diversity gradient. The latitudinal diversity gradient is one of the most widely recognized patterns in ecology. It has been observed to varying degrees in Earth's past. A parallel trend has been found with elevation (elevational diversity gradient), though this is less well-studied.

Explaining the latitudinal diversity gradient has been called one of the great contemporary challenges of biogeography and macroecology. The question "What determines patterns of species diversity?" was among the 25 key research themes for the future identified in 125th Anniversary issue of Science. There is a lack of consensus among ecologists about the mechanisms underlying the pattern, and many hypotheses have been proposed and debated. A recent review noted that among the many conundrums associated with the latitudinal diversity gradient (or latitudinal biodiversity gradient) the causal relationship between rates of molecular evolution and speciation has yet to be demonstrated.

Understanding the global distribution of biodiversity is important for ecologists and biogeographers. Understanding biodiversity facilitates various applications such as the spread of invasive species, the control of diseases and their vectors, and the likely effects of global climate change on biodiversity. Tropical areas play prominent roles in the understanding of the distribution of biodiversity, as their rates of habitat degradation and biodiversity loss are exceptionally high.

== Patterns in the past ==
The latitudinal diversity gradient is a noticeable pattern among modern organisms that has been described qualitatively and quantitatively. It has been studied at various taxonomic levels, through different time periods and across many geographic regions. The latitudinal diversity gradient has been observed to varying degrees in Earth's past, possibly due to differences in climate during various phases of Earth's history. Some studies indicate that the gradient was strong, particularly among marine taxa, while other studies of terrestrial taxa indicate it had little effect on the distribution of animals.

== Hypotheses for pattern ==
Although many of the hypotheses exploring the latitudinal diversity gradient are closely related and interdependent, most of the major hypotheses can be split into three general hypotheses.

=== Spatial/Area hypotheses ===
There are five major hypotheses that depend solely on the spatial and areal characteristics of the tropics.

==== Mid-domain effect ====
Using computer simulations, Colwell and Hurtt (1994) and Willig and Lyons (1998) first pointed out that if species' latitudinal ranges were randomly shuffled within the geometric constraints of a bounded biogeographical domain (e.g. the continents of the New World, for terrestrial species), species' ranges would tend to overlap more toward the center of the domain than towards its limits, forcing a mid-domain peak in species richness. Colwell and Lees (2000) called this stochastic phenomenon the mid-domain effect (MDE), presented several alternative analytical formulations for one-dimensional MDE (expanded by Connolly 2005), and suggested the hypothesis that MDE might contribute to the latitudinal gradient in species richness, together with other explanatory factors considered here, including climatic and historical ones. Because "pure" mid-domain models attempt to exclude any direct environmental or evolutionary influences on species richness, they have been claimed to be null models. On this view, if latitudinal gradients of species richness were determined solely by MDE, observed richness patterns at the biogeographic level would not be distinguishable from patterns produced by random placement of observed ranges. Others object that MDE models so far fail to exclude the role of the environment at the population level and in setting domain boundaries, and therefore cannot be considered null models. Mid-domain effects have proven controversial (e.g. Jetz and Rahbek 2001, Koleff and Gaston 2001, Lees and Colwell, 2007, Romdal et al. 2005, Rahbek et al. 2007, Storch et al. 2006; Bokma and Monkkonen 2001, Diniz-Filho et al. 2002, Hawkins and Diniz-Filho 2002, Kerr et al. 2006, Currie and Kerr, 2007). While some studies have found evidence of a potential role for MDE in latitudinal gradients of species richness, particularly for wide-ranging species (e.g. Jetz and Rahbek 2001, Koleff and Gaston 2001, Lees and Colwell, 2007, Romdal et al. 2005, Rahbek et al. 2007, Storch et al. 2006; Dunn et al. 2007) others report little correspondence between predicted and observed latitudinal diversity patterns (Bokma and Monkkonen 2001, Currie and Kerr, 2007, Diniz-Filho et al. 2002, Hawkins and Diniz-Filho 2002, Kerr et al. 2006).

==== Geographical area hypothesis ====
Another spatial hypothesis is the geographical area hypothesis (Terborgh 1973). It asserts that the tropics are the largest biome and that large tropical areas can support more species. More area in the tropics allows species to have larger ranges and consequently larger population sizes. Thus, species with larger ranges are likely to have lower extinction rates (Rosenzweig 2003). Additionally, species with larger ranges may be more likely to undergo allopatric speciation, which would increase rates of speciation (Rosenzweig 2003). The combination of lower extinction rates and high rates of speciation leads to the high levels of species richness in the tropics.

A critique of the geographical area hypothesis is that even if the tropics is the most extensive of the biomes, successive biomes north of the tropics all have about the same area. Thus, if the geographical area hypothesis is correct, these regions should all have approximately the same species richness, which is not true, as is referenced by the fact that polar regions contain fewer species than temperate regions (Gaston and Blackburn 2000). To explain this, Rosenzweig (1992) suggested that if species with partly tropical distributions were excluded, the richness gradient north of the tropics should disappear. Blackburn and Gaston 1997 tested the effect of removing tropical species on latitudinal patterns in avian species richness in the New World and found there is indeed a relationship between the land area and the species richness of a biome once predominantly tropical species are excluded. Perhaps a more serious flaw in this hypothesis is some biogeographers suggest that the terrestrial tropics are not, in fact, the largest biome, and thus this hypothesis is not a valid explanation for the latitudinal species diversity gradient (Rohde 1997, Hawkins and Porter 2001). In any event, it would be difficult to defend the tropics as a "biome" rather than the geographically diverse and disjunct regions that they truly include.

The effect of area on biodiversity patterns has been shown to be scale-dependent, having the strongest effect among species with small geographical ranges compared to those species with large ranges who are affected more so by other factors such as the mid-domain and/or temperature.

==== Species-energy hypothesis ====
The species energy hypothesis suggests the amount of available energy sets limits to the richness of the system. Thus, increased solar energy (with an abundance of water) at low latitudes causes increased net primary productivity (or photosynthesis). This hypothesis proposes the higher the net primary productivity the more individuals can be supported, and the more species there will be in an area. Put another way, this hypothesis suggests that extinction rates are reduced towards the equator as a result of the higher populations sustainable by the greater amount of available energy in the tropics. Lower extinction rates lead to more species in the tropics.

One critique of this hypothesis has been that increased species richness over broad spatial scales is not necessarily linked to an increased number of individuals, which in turn is not necessarily related to increased productivity. Additionally, the observed changes in the number of individuals in an area with latitude or productivity are either too small (or in the wrong direction) to account for the observed changes in species richness. The potential mechanisms underlying the species-energy hypothesis, their unique predictions and empirical support have been assessed in a major review by Currie et al. (2004).

The effect of energy has been supported by several studies in terrestrial and marine taxon.

==== Climate harshness hypothesis ====
Another climate-related hypothesis is the climate harshness hypothesis, which states the latitudinal diversity gradient may exist simply because fewer species can physiologically tolerate conditions at higher latitudes than at low latitudes because higher latitudes are often colder and drier than tropical latitudes. Currie et al. (2004) found fault with this hypothesis by stating that, although it is clear that climatic tolerance can limit species distributions, it appears that species are often absent from areas whose climate they can tolerate.

==== Climate stability hypothesis ====
Similarly to the climate harshness hypothesis, climate stability is suggested to be the reason for the latitudinal diversity gradient. The mechanism for this hypothesis is that while a fluctuating environment may increase the extinction rate or preclude specialization, a constant environment can allow species to specialize on predictable resources, allowing them to have narrower niches and facilitating speciation. The fact that temperate regions are more variable both seasonally and over geological timescales (discussed in more detail below) suggests that temperate regions are thus expected to have less species diversity than the tropics.

Critiques for this hypothesis include the fact that there are many exceptions to the assumption that climate stability means higher species diversity. For example, low species diversity is known to occur often in stable environments such as tropical mountaintops. Additionally, many habitats with high species diversity do experience seasonal climates, including many tropical regions that have highly seasonal rainfall (Brown and Lomolino 1998).

=== Historical/Evolutionary hypotheses ===
There are four main hypotheses that are related to historical and evolutionary explanations for the increase of species diversity towards the equator.

==== The historical perturbation hypothesis ====
The historical perturbation hypothesis proposes the low species richness of higher latitudes is a consequence of an insufficient time period available for species to colonize or recolonize areas because of historical perturbations such as glaciation (Brown and Lomolino 1998, Gaston and Blackburn 2000). This hypothesis suggests that diversity in the temperate regions has not yet reached equilibrium and that the number of species in temperate areas will continue to increase until saturated (Clarke and Crame 2003). However, in the marine environment, where there is also a latitudinal diversity gradient, there is no evidence of a latitudinal gradient in perturbation.

==== The evolutionary speed hypothesis ====
The evolutionary speed hypothesis argues higher evolutionary rates due to shorter generation times in the tropics have caused higher speciation rates and thus increased diversity at low latitudes. Higher evolutionary rates in the tropics have been attributed to higher ambient temperatures, higher mutation rates, shorter generation time and/or faster physiological processes, and increased selection pressure from other species that are themselves evolving. Faster rates of microevolution in warm climates (i.e. low latitudes and altitudes) have been shown for plants, mammals, birds, fish and amphibians. Bumblebee species inhabiting lower, warmer elevations have faster rates of both nuclear and mitochondrial genome-wide evolution. Based on the expectation that faster rates of microevolution result in faster rates of speciation, these results suggest that faster evolutionary rates in warm climates almost certainly have a strong influence on the latitudinal diversity gradient. However, recent evidence from marine fish and flowering plants have shown that rates of speciation actually decrease from the poles towards the equator at a global scale. Understanding whether extinction rate varies with latitude will also be important to whether or not this hypothesis is supported.

==== The hypothesis of effective evolutionary time ====
The hypothesis of effective evolutionary time assumes that diversity is determined by the evolutionary time under which ecosystems have existed under relatively unchanged conditions, and by evolutionary speed directly determined by the effect of temperature on mutation rates, generation times, and speed of selection. It differs from most other hypotheses in not postulating an upper limit to species richness set by various abiotic and biotic factors, i.e., it is a nonequilibrium hypothesis assuming a largely non-saturated niche space. It does accept that many other factors may play a role in causing latitudinal gradients in species richness as well. The hypothesis is supported by much recent evidence, in particular, the studies of Allen et al. and Wright et al.

==== The integrated evolutionary speed hypothesis ====
The integrated evolutionary speed hypothesis argues that species diversity increases due to faster rates of genetic evolution and speciation at lower latitudes where ecosystem productivity is generally greater. It differs from the effective evolutionary time hypothesis by recognizing that species richness generally increases with increasing ecosystem productivity and declines where high environmental energy (temperature) causes water deficits. It also proposes that evolutionary rate increases with population size, abiotic environmental heterogeneity, environmental change and via positive feedback with biotic heterogeneity. There is considerable support for faster rates of genetic evolution in warmer environments, some support for a slower rate among plant species where water availability is limited and for a slower rate among bird species with small population sizes. Many aspects of the hypothesis, however, remain untested.

=== Biotic hypotheses ===
Biotic hypotheses claim ecological species interactions such as competition, predation, mutualism, and parasitism are stronger in the tropics and these interactions promote species coexistence and specialization of species, leading to greater speciation in the tropics. These hypotheses are problematic because they cannot be the ultimate cause of the latitudinal diversity gradient as they fail to explain why species interactions might be stronger in the tropics. An example of one such hypothesis is the greater intensity of predation and more specialized predators in the tropics has contributed to the increase of diversity in the tropics (Pianka 1966). This intense predation could reduce the importance of competition (see competitive exclusion) and permit greater niche overlap and promote higher richness of prey. Some recent large-scale experiments suggest predation may indeed be more intense in the tropics, although this cannot be the ultimate cause of high tropical diversity because it fails to explain what gives rise to the richness of the predators in the tropics. Interestingly, the largest test of whether biotic interactions are strongest in the tropics, which focused on predation exerted by large fish predators in the world's open oceans, found predation to peak at mid-latitudes. Moreover, this test further revealed a negative association of predation intensity and species richness, thus contrasting the idea that strong predation near the equator drives or maintains high diversity. Other studies have failed to observe consistent changes in ecological interactions with latitude altogether (Lambers et al. 2002), suggesting that the intensity of species interactions is not correlated with the change in species richness with latitude. Overall, these results highlight the need for more studies on the importance of species interactions in driving global patterns of diversity.

== Synthesis and conclusions ==
There are many other hypotheses related to the latitudinal diversity gradient, but the above hypotheses are a good overview of the major ones still cited today.

Many of these hypotheses are similar to and dependent on one another. For example, the evolutionary hypotheses are closely dependent on the historical climate characteristics of the tropics.

=== The generality of the latitudinal diversity gradient ===
An extensive meta-analysis of nearly 600 latitudinal gradients from published literature tested the generality of the latitudinal diversity gradient across different organismal, habitat and regional characteristics. The results showed that the latitudinal gradient occurs in marine, terrestrial, and freshwater ecosystems, in both hemispheres. The gradient is steeper and more pronounced in richer taxa (i.e. taxa with more species), larger organisms, in marine and terrestrial versus freshwater ecosystems, and at regional versus local scales. The gradient steepness (the amount of change in species richness with latitude) is not influenced by dispersal, animal physiology (homeothermic or ectothermic) trophic level, hemisphere, or the latitudinal range of study. The study could not directly falsify or support any of the above hypotheses, however, results do suggest a combination of energy/climate and area processes likely contribute to the latitudinal species gradient. Notable exceptions to the trend include the ichneumonidae, shorebirds, penguins, and freshwater zooplankton. Also, in terrestrial ecosystems the soil bacterial diversity peaks in temperate climatic zones, and has been linked to carbon inputs and the microscale distribution of aqueous habitats.

=== Data robustness ===
One of the main assumptions about latitudinal diversity gradients and patterns in species richness is that the underlying data (i.e., the lists of species at specific locations) are complete. However, this assumption is not met in most cases. For instance, diversity patterns for blood parasites of birds suggest higher diversity in tropical regions, however, the data may be skewed by under sampling in rich faunal areas such as Southeast Asia and South America. For marine fishes, which are among the most studied taxonomic groups, current lists of species are considerably incomplete for most of the world's oceans. At a 3° (about 350 km^{2}) spatial resolution, less than 1.8% of the world's oceans have above 80% of their fish fauna currently described.

=== Conclusion ===
The fundamental macroecological question that the latitudinal diversity gradient depends on is "What causes patterns in species richness?". Species richness ultimately depends on whatever proximate factors are found to affect processes of speciation, extinction, immigration, and emigration. While some ecologists continue to search for the ultimate primary mechanism that causes the latitudinal richness gradient, many ecologists suggest instead this ecological pattern is likely to be generated by several contributory mechanisms (Gaston and Blackburn 2000, Willig et al. 2003, Rahbek et al. 2007). For now, the debate over the cause of the latitudinal diversity gradient will continue until a groundbreaking study provides conclusive evidence, or there is general consensus that multiple factors contribute to the pattern.

== See also ==
- Asynchrony of Seasons Hypothesis
- Biodiversity
- Biomass (ecology)
- Biomes
- Effective evolutionary time
- Evolution
- Extinction
- Latitude
- Primary production
- Speciation
- Species richness
- Tropics
- Lists of organisms by population
