= Effective evolutionary time =

Hypothesis offering a causal explanation of diversity gradients

The hypothesis of effective evolutionary time attempts to explain gradients, in particular latitudinal gradients in species diversity. It was originally named "time hypothesis".

== Background ==
Low (warm) latitudes contain significantly more species than high (cold) latitudes. This has been shown for many animal and plant groups, although exceptions exist (see latitudinal gradients in species diversity). An example of an exception is helminths of marine mammals, which have the greatest diversity in northern temperate seas, possibly because of small population densities of hosts in tropical seas that prevented the evolution of a rich helminth fauna, or because they originated in temperate seas and had more time for speciations there. It has become more and more apparent that species diversity is best correlated with environmental temperature and more generally environmental energy. These findings are the basis of the hypothesis of effective evolutionary time. Species have accumulated fastest in areas where temperatures are highest. Mutation rates and speed of selection due to faster physiological rates are highest, and generation times which also determine speed of selection, are smallest at high temperatures. This leads to a faster accumulation of species, which are absorbed into the abundantly available vacant niches, in the tropics. Vacant niches are available at all latitudes, and differences in the number of such niches can therefore not be the limiting factor for species richness. The hypothesis also incorporates a time factor: habitats with a long undisturbed evolutionary history will have greater diversity than habitats exposed to disturbances in evolutionary history.

The hypothesis of effective evolutionary time offers a causal explanation of diversity gradients, although it is recognized that many other factors can also contribute to and modulate them.

== Historical aspects ==
Some aspects of the hypothesis are based on earlier studies. Bernhard Rensch, for example, stated that evolutionary rates also depend on temperature: numbers of generation in poikilotherms, but sometimes also in homoiotherms (homoiothermic), are greater at higher temperatures and the effectiveness of selection is therefore greater. Ricklefs refers to this hypothesis as "hypothesis of evolutionary speed" or "higher speciation rates". Genera of Foraminifera in the Cretaceous and families of Brachiopoda in the Permian have greater evolutionary rates at low than at high latitudes. That mutation rates are greater at high temperatures has been known since the classical investigations of Nikolay Timofeev-Ressovsky et al. (1935), although few later studies have been conducted. Also, these findings were not applied to evolutionary problems.

The hypothesis of effective evolutionary time differs from these earlier approaches as follows. It proposes that species diversity is a direct consequence of temperature-dependent processes and the time ecosystems have existed under more or less equal conditions. Since vacant niches into which new species can be absorbed are available at all latitudes, the consequence is accumulation of more species at low latitudes. All earlier approaches remained without basis without the assumption of vacant niches, as there is no evidence that niches are generally narrower in the tropics, i.e., an accumulation of species cannot be explained by subdivision of previously utilized niches (see also Rapoport's rule). The hypothesis, in contrast to most other hypotheses attempting to explain latitudinal or other gradients in diversity, does not rely on the assumption that different latitudes or habitats generally have different "ceilings" for species numbers, which are higher in the tropics than in cold environments. Such different ceilings are thought to be, for example, determined by heterogeneity or area of the habitat. But such factors, although not setting ceilings, may well modulate the gradients.

== Recent studies ==
A considerable number of recent studies support the hypothesis. Thus, diversity of marine benthos, interrupted by some collapses and plateaus, has risen from the Cambrian to the Recent, and there is no evidence that saturation has been reached. Rates of diversification per time unit for birds and butterflies increase towards the tropics. Allen et al. found a general correlation between environmental temperature and species richness for North and Central American trees, for amphibians, fish, Prosobranchia and fish parasites. They showed that species richness can be predicted from the biochemical kinetics of metabolism, and concluded that evolutionary rates are determined by generation times and mutation rates both correlated with metabolic rates which have the same Boltzmann relation with temperature. They further concluded that these findings support the mechanisms for latitudinal gradients proposed by Rohde. Gillooly et al. (2002) described a general model also based on first principles of allometry and biochemical kinetics which makes predictions about generation times as a function of body size and temperature. Empirical findings support the predictions: in all cases that were investigated (birds, fish, amphibians, aquatic insects, zooplankton) generation times are negatively correlated with temperature. Brown et al.(2004) further developed these findings to a general metabolic theory of ecology. Indirect evidence points to increased mutation rates at higher temperatures, and the energy-speciation hypothesis is the best predictor for species richness of ants. Finally, computer simulations using the Chowdhury ecosystem model have shown that results correspond most closely to empirical data when the number of vacant niches is kept large. Rohde gives detailed discussions of these and other examples. Of particular importance is the study by Wright et al. (2006) which was specifically designed to test the hypothesis. It showed that molecular substitution rates of tropical woody plants are more than twice as large as those of temperate species, and that more effective genetic drift in smaller tropical populations cannot be responsible for the differences, leaving only direct temperature effects on mutation rates as an explanation. Gillman et al. (2009) examined 260 mammal species of 10 orders and 29 families and found that substitution rates in the cytochrome B gene were substantially faster in species at warm latitudes and elevations, compared with those from cold latitudes and elevations. A critical examination of the data showed that this cannot be attributed to gene drift or body mass differentials. The only possibilities left are a Red Queen effect or direct effects of thermal gradients (including possibly an effect of torpor/hibernation differentials). Rohde (1992, 1978) had already pointed out that “it may well be that mammalian diversity is entirely determined by the diversity of plants and poikilothermic animals further down in the hierarchy”, i.e., by a Red Queen effect. He also pointed out that exposure to irradiation including light is known to cause mutations in mammals, and that some homoiothermic animals have shorter generation times in the tropics, which - either separately or jointly - may explain the effect found by Gillman et al. Gillman et al. (2010) extended their earlier study on plants by determining whether the effect is also found within highly conserved DNA. They examined the 18S ribosomal gene in the same 45 pairs of plants. And indeed, the rate of evolution was 51% faster in the tropical than their temperate sister species. Furthermore, the substitution rate in 18S correlated positively with that in the more variable ITS. These result lend further very strong support to the hypothesis. Wright et al. (2010) tested the hypothesis on 188 species of amphibians belonging to 18 families, using mitochondrial RNA genes 12S and 16S, and found substantially faster substitution rates for species living in warmer habitats at both lower latitudes and lower elevations. Thus, the hypothesis has now been confirmed for several genes and for plants and animals.

Vázquez, D.P. and Stevens, R.D. (2004) conducted a metanalysis of previous studies and found no evidence that niches are generally narrower in the tropics than at high latitudes. This can be explained only by the assumption that niche space was not and is not saturated, having the capacity to absorb new species without affecting the niche width of species already present, as predicted by the hypothesis.

== Depth gradients ==
Species diversity in the deepsea has been largely underestimated until recently (e.g., Briggs 1994: total marine diversity less than 200,000 species). Although our knowledge is still very fragmentary, some recent studies appear to suggest much greater species numbers (e.g., Grassle and Maciolek 1992: 10 million macroinvertebrates in soft bottom sediments of the deepsea). Further studies must show whether this can be verified. A rich diversity in the deepsea can be explained by the hypothesis of effective evolutionary time: although temperatures are low, conditions have been more or less equal over large time spans, certainly much larger than in most or all surface waters.
