= Vacant niche =

A vacant niche or empty niche is an ecological niche in a particular ecosystem that is not occupied by a particular species. The issue of what exactly defines a vacant niche and whether they exist in ecosystems is controversial. The subject is intimately tied into a much broader debate on whether ecosystems can reach equilibrium, where they could theoretically become maximally saturated with species. Given that saturation is a measure of the number of species per resource axis per ecosystem, the question becomes: is it useful to define unused resource clusters as niche 'vacancies'?

== History of the concept ==
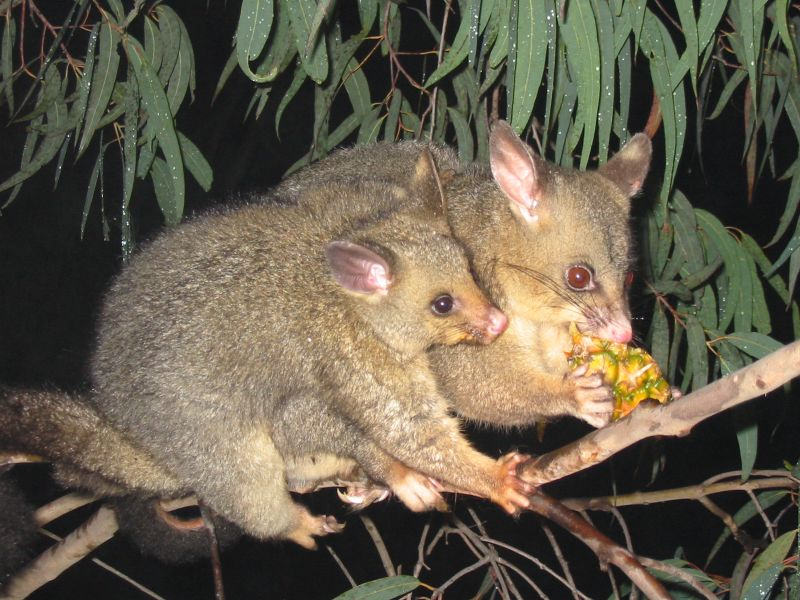
Introduced species, such as the common brushtail possum in New Zealand, are often free of many of their normal parasites.

Whether vacant niches are permissible has been both confirmed and denied as the definition of a niche has changed over time. In the framework of Grinnell (1917), the species niche was largely equivalent to its habitat, such that a niche vacancy could be looked upon as a habitat vacancy. The Eltonian framework considered the niche to be equivalent to a species position in a trophic web, or food chain, and in this respect there is always going to be a vacant niche at the top predator level. Whether this position gets filled depends upon the ecological efficiency of the species filling it however. The concept of the "vacant" or "empty niche" has been used regularly in the scientific literature.

The Hutchinsonian niche framework, on the other hand, directly precludes the possibility of there being vacant niches. Hutchinson defined the niche as an n-dimensional hyper-volume whose dimensions correspond to resource gradients over which species are distributed in a unimodal fashion. In this we see that the operational definition of his niche rests on the fact that a species is needed in order to rationally define a niche in the first place. This fact didn't stop Hutchinson from making statements inconsistent with this such as: “The question raised by cases like this is whether the three Nilghiri Corixinae fill all the available niches...or whether there are really empty niches.. . .The rapid spread of introduced species often gives evidence of empty niches, but such rapid spread in many instances has taken place in disturbed areas.”.

== Definitions ==
The most notable definition of a vacant niche is that of the ecologist K. Rohde, who has suggested that a vacant niche can be defined as the possibility that in ecosystems or habitats more species could exist than are present at a particular point in time, because many possibilities are not used by potentially existing species.

== Potential causes of vacant niches ==
Vacant niches could potentially have several causes.

• Radical disturbances in a habitat: For example, droughts or forest fires can destroy flora and fauna partially or completely. However, in such cases species suitable for the habitat usually survive in the neighbourhood and colonize the vacated niches, leading to a relatively fast re-establishment of the original conditions.

• Radical and long-lasting changes in the environment: such as ice ages.

• Evolutionary contingencies: suitable species did not evolve for usually unknown reasons, or niche segregation between pre-existing species created a novel niche vacancy.

== Demonstration of vacant niches ==
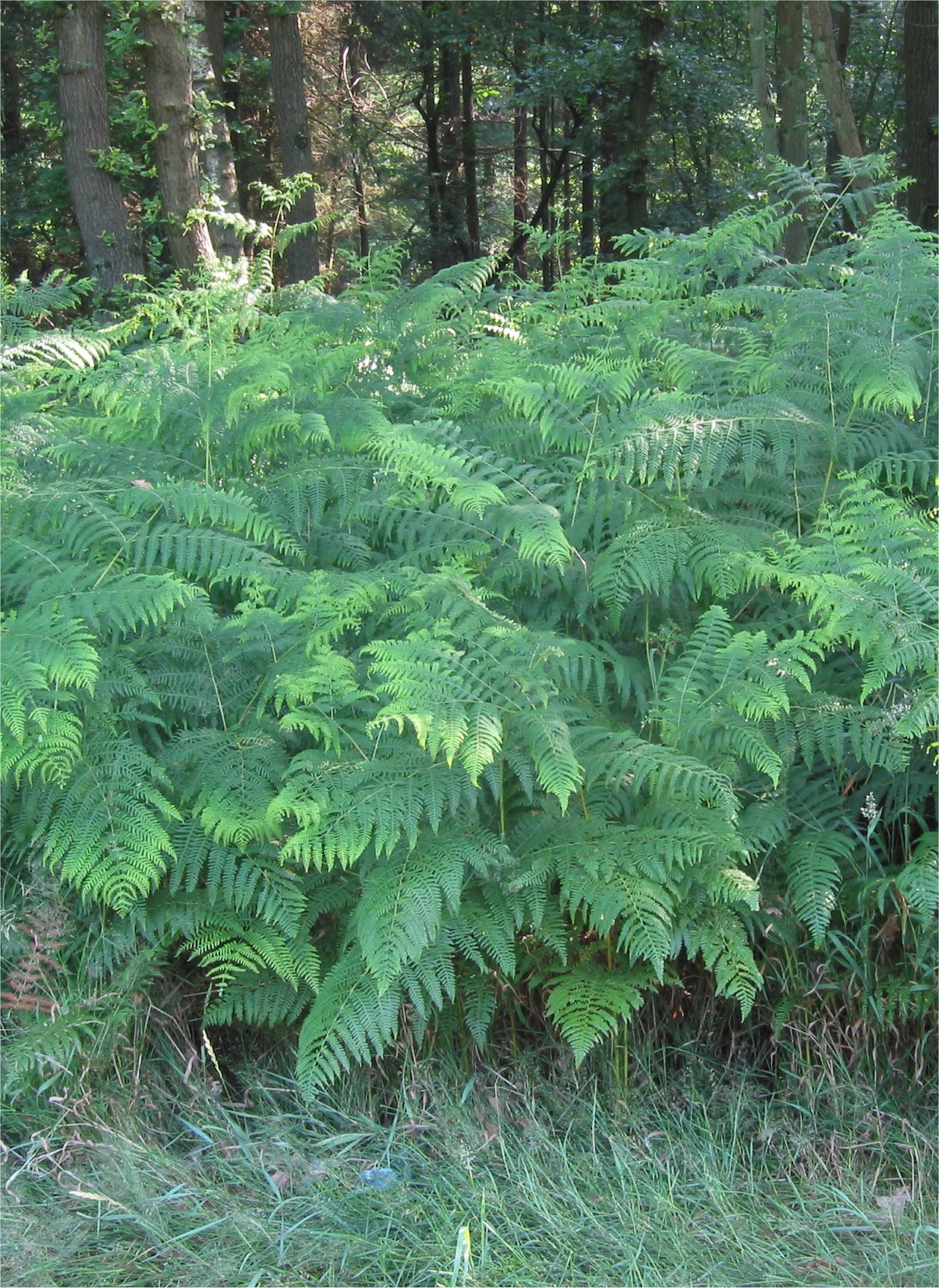
Studies of Pteridium aquilinum provide evidence of vacant niches.

Vacant niches can best be demonstrated by considering the spatial component of niches in simple habitats. For example, Lawton and collaborators compared the insect fauna of the bracken Pteridium aquilinum, a widely distributed species, in different habitats and geographical regions and found vastly differing numbers of insect species. They concluded that many niches remain vacant.

Rohde and collaborators have shown that the number of ectoparasitic species on the gills of different species of marine fishes varies from 0 to about 30, even when fish of similar size and from similar habitats are compared. Assuming that the host species with the largest number of parasite species has the largest possible number of parasite species, only about 16% of all niches are occupied. However, the maximum may well be greater, since the possibility cannot be excluded that even on fish with a rich parasite fauna, more species could be accommodated. Using similar reasoning, Walker and Valentine (1984) estimated that 12-54% of niches for marine invertebrates are empty.

The ground breaking theoretical investigations of Kauffman (1993) and Wolfram (2002) also suggest the existence of a vast number of vacant niches. Using different approaches, both have shown that species rarely if ever reach global adaptive optima. Rather, they get trapped in local optima from which they cannot escape, i.e., they are not perfectly adapted. As the number of potential local optima is almost infinite, the niche space is largely unsaturated and species have little opportunity for interspecific competition. Kauffman (p. 19) writes: “...many conceivable useful phenotypes do not exist” and: (p. 218) “Landscapes are rugged and multipeaked. Adaptive processes typically become trapped on such optima”.

The packing rules can be used as a measure of the filling of niche space. They apply to savanna plants and large herbivorous mammals, but not to all the parasite species examined so far. It seems likely that they do not apply to most animal groups. In other words, most species are not densely packed: many niches remain empty.

That niche space may not be saturated is also shown by introduced pest species. Such species lose, almost without exception, all or many of their parasites. Species that could occupy the vacant niches either do not exist or, if they exist, cannot adapt to these niches.

The diversity of marine benthos, i.e. the organisms living near the seabed, though interrupted by some collapses and plateaus has increased from the Cambrian to the Recent. Furthermore, there is no evidence to suggest that saturation has been reached.

== Consequences of the nonsaturation of niche space ==
The view that niche space is largely or completely saturated with species is widespread. It is thought that new species are accommodated mainly by subdivision of niches occupied by previously existing species, although an increase in diversity by colonization of large empty living spaces (such as land in the geologic past) or by the formation of new baupläne also occurs. It is also recognized that many populations never completely reach a climax state (i.e., they may come close to an equilibrium but never quite reach it). However, altogether the view prevails that individuals and species are densely packed and that interspecific competition is of paramount significance. According to this view, nonequilibria are generally caused by environmental disturbances.

However, many recent studies support the view that niche space is largely unsaturated, i.e. that numerous vacant niches exist. As a consequence, competition between species is not as important as usually assumed. Nonequilibria are caused not only by environmental disturbances, but are widespread because of nonsaturation of niche space. Newly evolved species are absorbed into empty niche space, that is, niches occupied by existing species do not necessarily have to shrink.

== Relative frequency of vacant niches in various groups of animals and plants ==
Available evidence suggests that vacant niches are more common in some groups than in others. Using SES values (standardized effect sizes) for various groups, which can be used as approximate predictors of the filling of niche space, Gotelli and Rohde (2002) have shown that SES values are high for large and vagile species or for those which occur in large population densities, and that they are low for animal species which occur in small population densities and/or are of small body size and have little vagility. In other words, more vacant niches can be expected for the latter.

== Criticisms of the concept ==
Not all researchers accept the concept of vacant niches. If one defines a niche as a property of a species, then a niche does not exist if no species is present. In other words, the term appears "illogical". However, some authors who have contributed most to the formulation of the modern niche concept (Hutchinson, Elton) apparently saw no difficulties in using the term. If a niche is defined as the interrelationship of a species with all the biotic and abiotic factors affecting it, there is no reason not to admit the possibility of additional potential interrelationships. So it seems logical to refer to vacant niches.

Furthermore, it seems that authors most critical of the concept "vacant niche" really are critical of the view that niche space is largely empty and can easily absorb additional species. They instead adhere to the view that communities are usually in equilibrium (or at least close to it), resulting in a continual strong competition for resources. But many recent studies, some empirical, some theoretical, have provided support for the alternate view that nonequilibrium conditions are widespread.

In the German literature, an alternate term for vacant niches has found some acceptance - that of freie ökologische Lizens (free ecological license). It has been argued that this conceptualization has a disadvantage in that it does not convey immediately and easily what is meant, furthermore the concept does not correspond exactly to the term "vacant niche". The usefulness of a term should be assessed on the basis of its understandability and on its capacity to promote future research. The term "vacant niche" appears to fulfill these requirements.

== See also ==
- Effective evolutionary time
- Niche segregation
