= Joseph H. Connell =

American ecologist (1923–2020)

- Born: 5 October 1923; Gary, Indiana, USA
- Died: 1 September 2020 (aged 96); Goleta, California, USA
- Education: University of Chicago; University of California, Berkeley; University of Glasgow
- Known for: Intermediate Disturbance Hypothesis; Janzen–Connell hypothesis research on competition
- Scientific career
- Fields: ecology

Joseph Hurd Connell FAA (5 October 1923 – 1 September 2020) was an American ecologist. He earned his MA degree in zoology at the University of California, Berkeley and his PhD at Glasgow University. One of Connell's early research papers examined the effects of interspecific competition and predation on populations of a barnacle species on the rocky shores of Scotland. According to Connell, this classic paper is often cited because it addressed ecological topics that previously had been given minor roles. Together, with a subsequent barnacle study on the influence of competition and desiccation, these two influential papers have laid the foundation for future research and the findings continue to have relevance to current ecology. His early work earned him a Guggenheim fellowship in 1962 and the George Mercer Award in 1963.

In 2010, a symposium was held in his honour by the Ecological Society of America, the proceedings of which said that "Connell's observations, insights, syntheses, and example have motivated education and research in population and community ecology for over six decades". Among his important works were the Connell–Slatyer model of ecological succession (facilitation, tolerance and inhibition) and the Janzen-Connell hypothesis that explains plant-species diversity in tropical forests. Other notable works are his 1978 intermediate disturbance hypothesis and his thirty-year study of corals in the Great Barrier Reef.

He was a corresponding member of the Australian Academy of Science (2002), a member of the American Academy of Arts and Sciences, and a Guggenheim fellow, and has received the Eminent Ecologist Award from the Ecological Society of America. He was a professor emeritus at the University of California Santa Barbara until his death in September 2020.

== Research ==
Connell was best known for his work studying tropical diversity. Much of his work focused on community structure, examining the roles of physical factors, species interactions ( competition, predation, recruitment) and disturbances.

Connell's paper on "Diversity in tropical rain forest and coral reefs" made it clear that disturbance has crucial impacts on ecological communities. This article discuss the organisation and assemblages of coral reefs and tropical rain forest. He explored that trees in the tropical rain forest and coral reefs are in non-equilibrium state, and if they are not disturbed, then they will progress towards low-diversity equilibrium community.

Besides this foundational paper, he wrote numerous other papers that explore ecological community structure, patterns of succession and species biodiversity. As a teacher he encouraged his students to go beyond and look beneath the surface and evaluate the ecological matter. As a mentor, he was very eager to discuss ecological concepts with his undergraduate students, and help them in their work. He received awards such as George Mercer Award in 1963. and Eminent Ecologist Award form Ecological Society of America.

[1] ESA History. Ecological Society of America. Web. 21 February 2014.

[1] Connell, J. H. (1978). Diversity in tropical rain forests and coral reefs. Science, 199(4335), 1302-1310.

[1] Day, R. W., Huchette, S., Haliotis, S. F., Dixon, C., Murdoch, W. W., Nisbet, R. M., & Briggs, C. J. A Celebration and Exploration of Joseph H. Connell's Conceptual and Empirical Influence, Inspiration, and Legacy in Ecological Research and Education.

[2] http://www.esa.org/history/Awards/bulletin/eminent1985.pdf

== Selected publications ==
- Joseph H. Connell. Diversity in Tropical Rain Forests and Coral Reefs (PDF). Science, New Series, Vol. 199, No. 4335. (March 24, 1978), pp. 1302–1310.
- Joseph H. Connell; Ralph O. Slatyer. Mechanisms of Succession in Natural Communities and Their Role in Community Stability and Organization (PDF). The American Naturalist, Vol. 111, No. 982. (November - December 1977), pp. 1119–1144.
- Joseph H. Connell. The influence of interspecific competition and other factors on the distribution of the barnacle Chthamalus stellatus (PDF). Ecology 42(4) (October 1961), 710-723.
