= All-taxa biodiversity inventory =

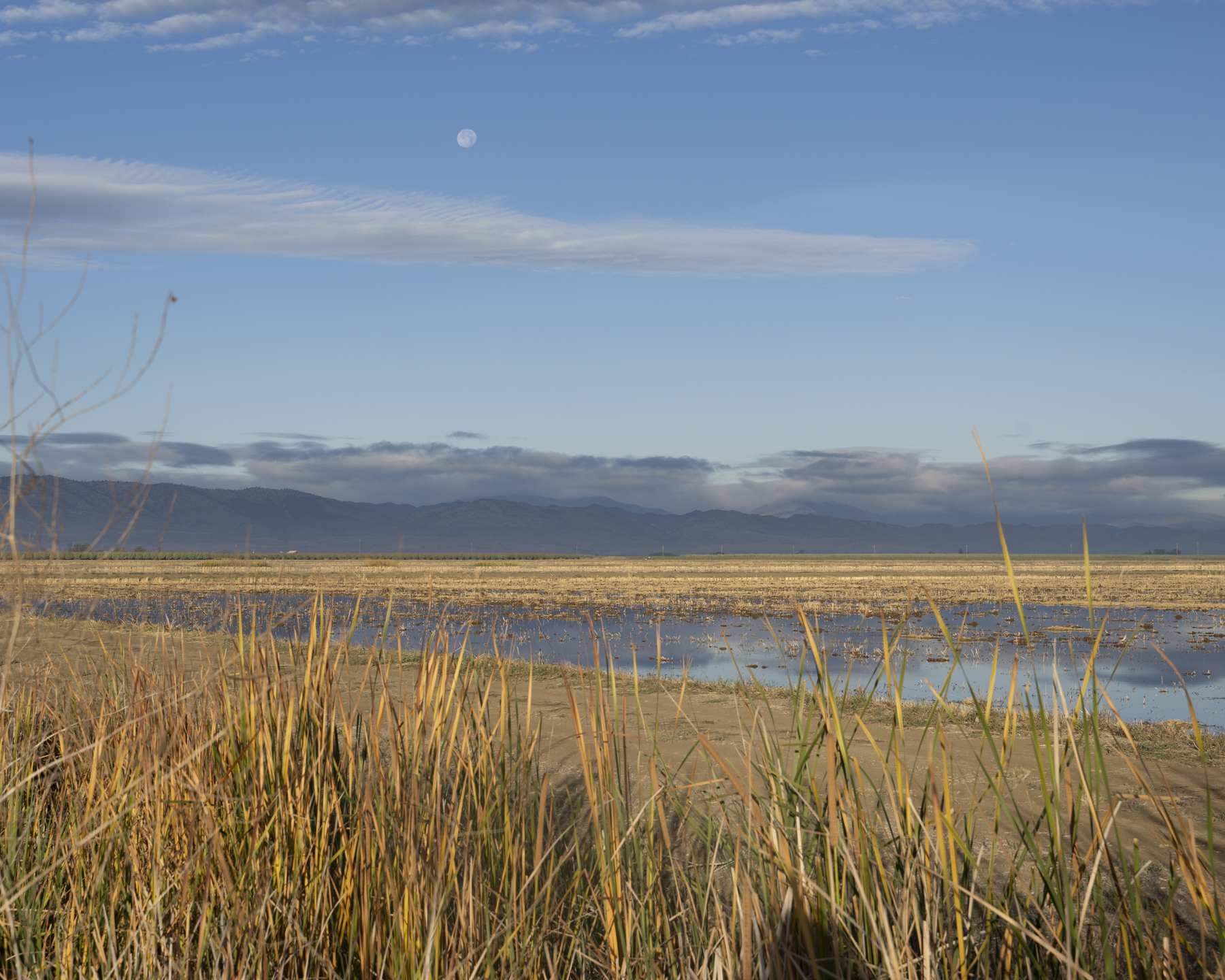

An all-taxa biodiversity inventory, or ATBI, is an attempt to document and identify all biological species living in some defined area, usually a park, reserve, or research area. The term was coined in 1993, in connection with an effort initiated by ecologist Daniel Janzen to document the diversity of the Guanacaste National Park in Costa Rica.

One of the most active and perhaps most thorough ATBIs to date focuses on the Great Smoky Mountains National Park of the southeastern United States. Initiated in 1998, the Smokies ATBI is managed by a non-profit NGO, called Discover Life in America, in coordination with the National Park Service. Over more than 20 years, the Smokies ATBI has added more than 10,000 species records for Great Smoky Mountains National Park, including more than 1,000 newly-described species, bringing the total known diversity of the Park to over 20,000 species.

A number of other, similar, efforts have been initiated for a variety of parks and research field stations.

According to Kieth Langdon and Peter White of the Smoky Mountains ATBI, an "ATBI is about the discovery and taxonomic identification of species and the creation of museum specimens and data that document those species, but it seeks to develop taxonomic information in an ecological, conservation, and educational context."

All ATBIs are inherently incomplete since, a) the biota of even well-studied areas includes many undescribed and often difficult-to-study species, and b) new species are regularly established through immigration and introduction.

== Background ==
Since taxonomy provides the baseline data and operational framework for biodiversity conservation, the fragmented nature of existing taxonomic data and the large number of organisms yet to be described pose significant challenges.

The current state of baseline inventory data is inadequate even in most currently protected areas, and basic data is lacking in many areas for the groups that form the largest diversity of species — for example, invertebrates, fungi, and microorganisms.

Traditional, taxon-focused biological inventories are skewed toward better known species, like mammals, birds and vascular plants, while inventories that include smaller, more obscure organisms can paint a more complete picture of local biodiversity. Since these less popular organisms — invertebrates, fungi, algae, microbes — can play significant roles in ecosystem function, a full accounting of all taxa in a given location can improve conservation and management of biodiversity.

Biologists have argued that the developing biodiversity crisis, with its accelerating rate of species extinction, "should put taxonomic urgency at the top of the priority list for biological sciences in our 'century of extinctions.'" The global rate of species extinction is already tens to hundreds of times higher than the average rate over the past 10 million years, and is accelerating, according to the most recent Global Biodiversity Assessment.

Daniel Janzen, an ecologist who helped initiate the first ATBIs, has characterized the approach as "a direct response to, and a test of the ideas in" the Global Biodiversity Assessment.

The 1992 Convention on Biological Diversity acknowledged a taxonomic impediment to the management and conservation of biological life on earth. ATBIs are one method of addressing this challenge. The convention's Global Taxonomy Initiative included "efforts to carry out All-Taxon Biodiversity Inventories (ATBIs)" in its planned activities for protected areas at the COP8 meeting in 2006.

Langdon and White, in their overview of the ATBI in the Great Smoky Mountains National Park, observed:

"There is a fundamental flaw in how most parks and other natural reserves have been managed. In general, we have ignored a basic principle that would be fatal in the competitive world of business: we have never attempted a comprehensive inventory of our resources. This is surprising since the clearly stated purpose of most governmental and non-governmental conservation organizations has always been to protect and preserve the natural and cultural resources entrusted to their stewardship. How can we be intelligent stewards if we do not even know what kinds of resources we have, where they are found, their rarity, or, in the case of natural resources, some inkling of their ecological role?"

== Implementation and Value ==
An ATBI usually includes a combination of highly specialized biologists and trained nonspecialists referred to as parataxonomists, who together collect, sort and identify species across the broadest possible range of taxa in a given area. These efforts can involve dozens, hundreds, or thousands of people and take place over months, years or decades depending on the size and diversity of the area studied.

Janzen, who helped convene the first ATBIs, wrote that the "immediate technical ATBI task is to determine for each species:

- what it is (and how to distinguish it from others),
- where it is,
- how to capture or see it when desired,
- what it does,

and electronically manage this information, as though it were one enormous dynamic publication - full-text searchable, easily re-organizable, easily accessible - in the public domain. And to reach this goal with a team of national human resources working in collaboration with the international community of scientists and other users."

Other benefits of this method as described by Janzen include "generating an enormous tool box, library and living museum for those searching for a particular bit of information, searching for a solution to a wildland biodiversity problem, or having to manage and develop a complex conserved wildland."

A National Park Service overview of all-taxa inventory techniques distinguished ATBIs from similar approaches because of their focus on a single geographic site selected for a specific purpose. Other approaches are broader in scope, like All Biota Inventories that focus on specific taxa worldwide, or are narrower in time and effort, like Rapid Biodiversity Assessments and 24-hour BioBlitzes (often used in emergency contexts and public outreach, respectively.)

ATBI surveys in carefully chosen biodiversity hotspots could cover a significant portion of the world's biodiversity.

The value of ATBIs conducted at priority sites is not only to approach a complete record of species present, but to use these intensively studied sites to calibrate other methods of extrapolation for less intensively studied sites.

=== DNA Techniques ===
Although several of the early efforts at systematic ATBIs have been discontinued, a new generation of biological inventories are drawing on the speed and efficiency of DNA barcoding for taxonomic identification. These efforts have the potential to greatly improve the feasibility of all taxa inventories. A paper on integrating DNA barcoding techniques into tropical biodiversity research observed that "this kind of ultra-fine-scale examination of complex tropical ecosystems has required an enormous amount of sweat-equity support from the taxasphere — the collected global array of taxonomists, collections and their knowledge in mind and print."

Barcoding can greatly assist in this task, at the risk of complicating it by revealing so-called 'cryptic' species, differentiated by their DNA but morphologically similar. Discovery and description of these species requires larger sample sizes and sampling effort.

=== Drawbacks ===
One study estimated that the effort required to conduct an ATBI on a representative hectare of tropical forest in a 'reasonable time' would occupy 10-20% of the entire global workforce of systemists. Difficulties it cited included the magnitude of species in a tropical forest (estimated at 10 to 100 times more than the 2,000 species in the study sample), and the inverse relationship of organism body length with the number of scientist-hours required to process samples.

Baldi suggested that search-based taxonomic inventories provide taxonomic completeness, especially when involving taxonomic specialists, in contrast to ecologically designed inventories, which provide replicability and comparative power. This is a tension within the ATBI approach. As noted in a paper from an ATBI in the Maritime Alps, "In practice, however, because ecological and genetic objectives are usually added to such inventories, replicates are needed, resulting in a lower diversity of sampled habitats and hence a lower number of species obtained for a given sampling effort."

The National Park Service report notes:

"There is no easy alternative for biodiversity assessment in the context of sustainable natural resource management to protect and conserve biodiversity while human needs of land use or land conversion are met. In other words, we should know what we have before we use or alter it for human enterprise. It is imperative that every effort is made to identify or describe specimens to species level collected from biodiversity assessments."

== History ==
The ATBI concept originated at a 1994 workshop sponsored by the National Science Foundation at the University of Pennsylvania. The workshop, organized by tropical ecologists Daniel Janzen and Winnifred Hallwachs, brought 45 systematists and biodiversity experts together to discuss the execution of the world's first ATBI. At this first conference, the researchers contended with several challenges to carrying out a comprehensive ATBI — the lack of specialists for many groups of organisms, the concentration of species in diversity hotspots like rainforests, and the lack of an organizational structure for standardizing and cataloging collections.

Janzen was inspired to propose the first ATBi by the diversity of the dry forest ecosystem in Guanacaste National Park, a park that he helped found. He referred to this first ATBI, in Costa Rica, as a "biodiversity moonshot."

In 1994, a group of U.S. and British soil ecologists and taxonomists met to address the challenge of identifying the millions of species that populate soil. They outlined an approach for an international multi site soil biodiversity survey to complement the ATBI approach.

In July 1994, the Costa Rican government agreed to conduct an ATBI in the Guanacaste Conservation Area, carried out by Costa Rica's National Biodiversity Institute. However, in 1996 this initial attempt ended when funding was redirected elsewhere.

In 1997, a second conference was convened to discuss establishing an ATBI at the Great Smoky Mountains National Park. This project went on to become the first and longest-running ATBI to date, conducted by the National Park Service in collaboration with the nonprofit Discover Life in America. It has so far doubled the known number of species for the park, and described more than 1,000 entirely new species.

By the early 2000s, momentum had built behind the idea of completing a full inventory of the Earth's biota, and several initiatives were under way toward this end, including efforts like the National Science Foundation's Planetary Biodiversity Inventories and the All Species Foundation.

In 2005, a New Zealand Department of Conservation report observed that, "There seems little question that all-taxa biodiversity inventories (ATBI) will eventually be a mandated national goal. There will also be calls for comprehensive 'tree of life' phylogeny programmes spurred on by availability of cost-effective molecular technology, and proposed as a matter of national urgency. The question facing conservation agencies is to what degree are they responsible for achieving such a goal, and how much time and funding should they invest in species inventory versus other priorities."

This question remains as many ATBIs have stalled because of lack of funding, changing research priorities, and limited availability of expert taxonomists.

In 2006 and 2007, the European Distributed Institute for Taxonomy held workshops to propose protected areas as potential ATBI pilot sites, and between 2007 and 2008 established two large pilots in the Maritime Alps and the Gemer Region of Slovakia. The rationale for these and other areas was:

"The increasing need of sound taxonomic information and expertise for the successful implementation of biodiversity policies and, especially, conservation management programmes has been expressed widely at European and international fora. With the prevailing political focus on the establishment of an effective global network of protected areas for biodiversity conservation, efforts supporting an efficient inventorying and monitoring of biodiversity in existing and proposed protected areas seem particularly pertinent."

In 2015, researchers working in the Maritime Alps ATBI reported that biological inventories have experienced a renewal, but that "massive inventories, involving a wide range of taxa, remain exceptional."

== ATBIs by Country ==
=== Costa Rica ===
==== Area de Conservación Guanacaste ====
After the 1993 NSF workshop concluded that it was possible to do a serious inventory of a large, complex area of biodiversity, the participants decided to focus on an area in Northwestern Costa Rica that constituted a complete dry forest ecosystem along with an adjacent rain forest and cloud forest. This 120,000-hectare (460 sq mi) network of protected areas became the focal point for a planning process that included Costa Rica's Instituto Nacional de Biodiversidad (INBio), the Norwegian Agency for Development Corporation, the National Science Foundation, and international specialists from taxonomy working groups for hymenoptera, coleoptera, vertebrates, nematodes, fungus, and molluscs. Due to political and funding disagreements, this ATBI was never actually conducted, but the planning that went into it went on to inform a subsequent ATBI in the Great Smoky Mountains National Park.

==== Zurquí All Diptera Biodiversity Inventory ====
A study assessed the species richness of a mega-diverse order of insects as a result of Zurquí All Diptera Biodiversity Inventory project at Costa Rica for one year, identifying more than 40,000 flies to 4,332 species, including 73 of the world's 160 Diptera families.

==== Arthropods of La Selva (ALAS) ====
Although limited to arthropods, this project at the La Selva Biological Station began in 1991 with the goal of inventorying these 'megadiverse focal taxa' and continued until 2005. It collected and identified specimens using a combination of local parataxonomists and more than one hundred collaborating taxonomists from the international community.

=== United States ===
==== Great Smoky Mountains National Park ====
The first large-scale ATBI, the Smokies were the agreed-upon location for the second attempt at an ATBI following the collapse of the first agreement in Costa Rica. Involving the same collaboration with taxonomists as well as with Janzen and Hallwachs, this ATBI was a partnership between the National Park Service and a purpose-made nonprofit, Discover Life in America. According to Keith Langdon, the Parks Service coordinator for the project, it would have taken about 150 years to complete a basic inventory of species across all taxa at the rate the park had been accumulating inventory data in the past. The ongoing ATBI has resulted in a doubling of the species recorded in the park, to 20,000, and the description of more than 1,000 species new to science.

==== Tennessee State Parks ====
Modeled on the ATBI at the Great Smoky Mountains National Park and with advice from members of that project, this effort began in 2003 and involved various naturalists, Tennessee State Parks staff, and university researchers.

==== Rocky Mountain National Park ====
A combination ATBI and BioBlitz, this effort was the result of a collaboration between the E.O. Wilson Biodiversity Foundation, the National Park Service, Discover Life in America, and the Turner Endangered Species fund to deploy graduate student "Bioblitz SWAT Teams" to determine and fill in major gaps in biodiversity research.

==== Tomales Bay, California ====
The Point Reyes National Seashore began an ATBI of Tomales Bay, California, in 2002. By 2004 the ATBI had documented more than 2000 species, including almost 500 that had not been previously documented in the area.

==== Crane Hollow, Ohio ====
This ATBI is a collaboration between Crane Hollow Nature Preserve and Ohio University. Since 2002, more than 11,700 species have been identified from a less than 2,000 acre parcel of Appalachian Ohio.

California

California is one of 35 biodiversity hotspots on the planet. The scale of that diversity means much of it remains unexplored. The California ATBI initiative is a voucher-based, DNA-powered undertaking intended to secure specimens of every species and sequence DNA barcodes for every taxon. Current efforts focus on Insecta, Funga, Soil Biodiversity, and Intertidal Biodiversity.

==== Hawaii Biological Survey ====
Modeled in part on the ATBI concept, the Hawaii Biological Survey began in 1992 with the aim of "developing a complete inventory of plants, animals and other organisms within the State of Hawaii." The Hawaii Biological Survey is differentiated from an ATBI in that it places more emphasis on developing inventories from existing collections and literature than on conducting field inventories.

=== Europe ===
Several ATBIs in Europe were established as part of an effort by the European Distributed Institute of Taxonomy, supported by the European Commission, to strengthen the input of taxonomy into biodiversity conservation. These ATBIs were dubbed ATBI-Ms for their emphasis on future monitoring by collecting other ecological criteria besides presence/absence of species. The largest of them is the combined ATBI of Mercantour National Park (France) and the adjoining Parco Naturale Alpi Marittime (Italy), but they also include smaller pilot projects in Germany and Slovakia.

==== France and Italy ====
Launched in 2006, the Mercantour/Maritime Alps ATBI has inventoried over 10,000 species, with the help of over 50 researchers divided in 23 teams, from France, Germany, Italy, Austria, Spain, Portugal Greece, and the United States.

==== Germany ====
A pilot ATBI-M was launched in the Spreewald Biosphere Reserve in Germany in 2010. To date, 735 species have been documented by the project.

==== Slovakia ====
Starting in 2007, three national parks in the Gemer region of Slovakia have been included in an ATBI-M. They have been visited by dozens of contributing specialists from around Europe, who as of 2010 had identified 3236 species.

==== Sweden ====
Launched in 2002, the Swedish Taxonomy Initiative aimed to complete an inventory of Sweden's fauna and flora within 20 years. By 2022, more than 2,000 new species had been identified, more than half of which are poorly known. This is so far the only national ATBI conducted anywhere, and has produced detailed observations including a series of illustrates encyclopedias of Swedish Flora and Fauna. The project has received robust public funding, and as part of its mission has also cultivated new generations of taxonomists and funded the renovation of museum collections. The Swedish Malaise Trap Project, an ambitious insect inventory, is part of this effort, and as of 2020 had processed over 4,000 species, many of which are new to Sweden, and nearly 700 of which are new to science. The share of the Malaise Trap collection processed and identified so far represents only about 1% of the total material collected.

==== Hungary ====
Arguably one of the first ATBIs, although not labeled as such at the time, occurred in Hungary, where intensive inventories of all flora and fauna were conducted in six protected areas during the 1970s, 1980s and 1990s. These surveys drew on both specialists and parataxonomists, with up to 83 participants helping to survey a single park. At one area, Bükk National Park, nearly ten thousand species were identified between 1981 and 1985. These inventories, which strove to include 'unpopular' groups of organisms, yielded very high species compared to other surveys in Europe.

== See also ==
- Biodiversity
- Taxonomy
- Measurement of biodiversity
- Bioblitz
- Encyclopedia of Life
- Earth Biogenome Project
