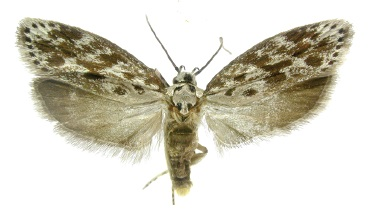

Scientific classification
- Domain: Eukaryota
- Kingdom: Animalia
- Phylum: Arthropoda
- Class: Insecta
- Order: Lepidoptera
- Family: Depressariidae
- Genus: Ethmia
- Species: E. dimauraorum

Binomial name
- Ethmia dimauraorum Phillips, 2014

= Ethmia dimauraorum =

Species of moth

Ethmia dimauraorum is a moth in the family Depressariidae. It is found in Costa Rica, where it has been recorded at altitudes between 700 and 1,300 meters (2,300 and 4,300 ft) on the Pacific slope of the Cordillera de Guanacaste, at 750 meters (2,460 ft) in the Cordillera Central and at 1,000 meters (3,300 ft) at the Caribbean side of the Cordillera de Tilarán.

The length of the forewings is 8.1–9.1 mm (0.32–0.36 in) for males and 8.3–9.1 mm (0.33–0.36 in) for females. The ground colour of the forewings is whitish mostly covered with irregular dark brown elongated markings except by the apex. There are two distinct dark brown dots at the base of the posterior half. The terminal line is composed of eight blackish dots from before the costa to the tornus. The hindwing ground colour is brown, darker at the apex.

== Etymology ==
The species is named in honor of Paul and Karen Dimaura, who have allowed the University of Pennsylvania to support Daniel H. Janzen and Winnie Hallwachs full-time in their efforts to facilitate the germination and growth of Area de Conservación Guanacaste, INBio, and the Guanacaste Dry Forest Conservation Fund.
