= Winifred Hallwachs =

U.S. entomologist and tropical ecologist

Winnie Hallwachs
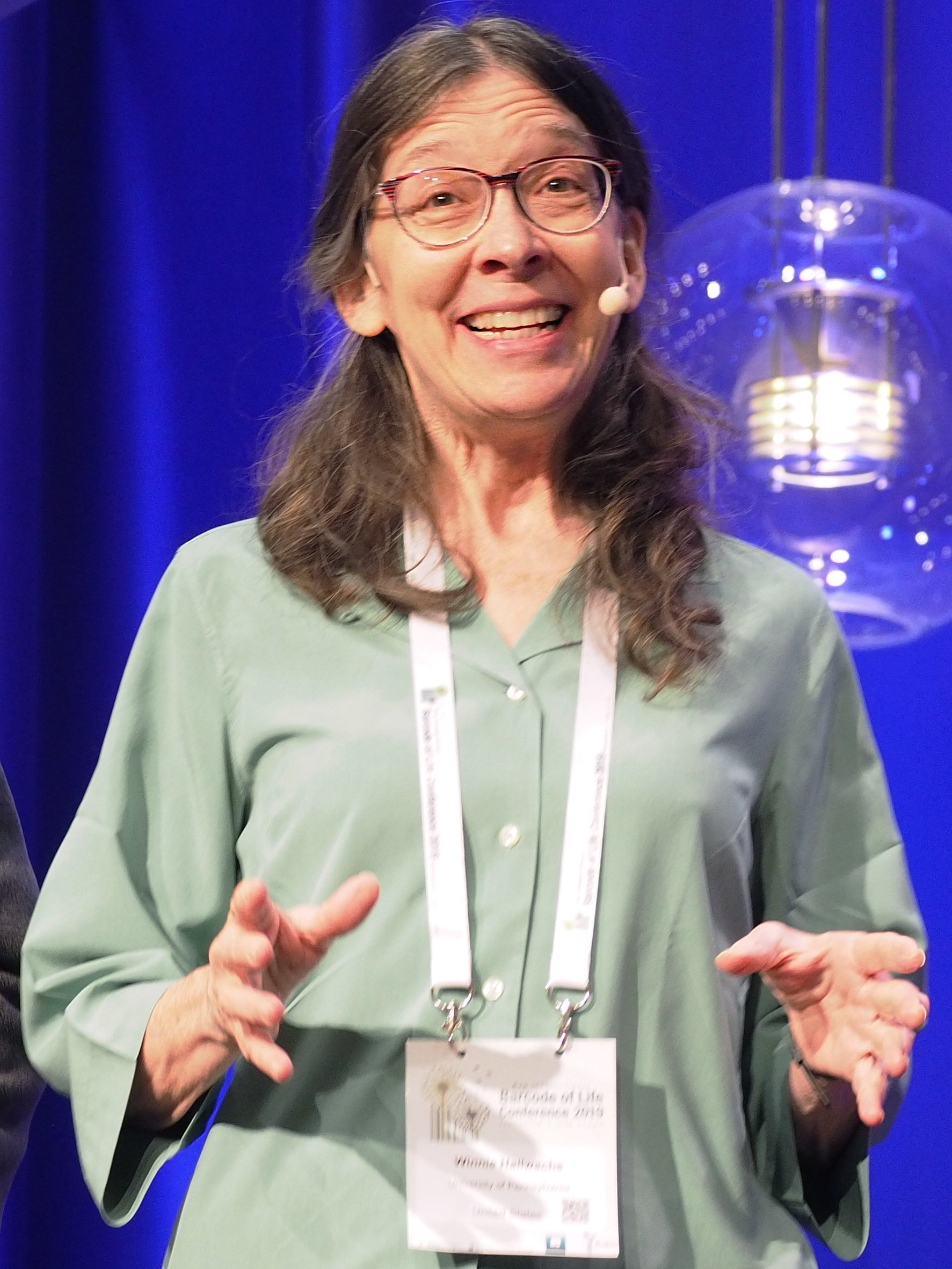
- Born: Winifred Hallwachs; October 11, 1954 (age 71)
- Education: Philadelphia High School for Girls, Princeton University, Cornell University
- Known for: Tropical ecology, biodiversity development
- Spouse: Daniel H. Janzen
- Scientific career
- Workplaces: University of Pennsylvania, Guanacaste Dry Forest Conservation Fund, Área de Conservación Guanacaste

Winifred Hallwachs (born October 11, 1954) is an American tropical ecologist who helped to establish and expand northwestern Costa Rica's Área de Conservación Guanacaste (ACG). The work of Hallwachs and her husband Daniel Janzen at ACG is considered an exemplar of inclusive conservation.

Beginning in 1978, Winnie Hallwachs' early research focused on the Central American agoutis as seed hoarders and their effectiveness as seed dispersers of the hardwood tree guapinol.

Beginning in 1985, Hallwachs and Janzen revised their work to include the restoration, expansion, and conservation of tropical dry forest through biodiversity development. They helped found the Instituto Nacional de Biodiversidad (INBio) in 1989, of which Hallwachs was a technical advisor, and promoted the creation of public-private partnerships such as the Merck-INBio Agreement. Hallwachs and Janzen founded the Guanacaste Dry Forest Conservation Fund (GDFCF) in 1997, and helped to establish the ACG in 1999. They have been active at all levels of education, ranging from local children to resident parataxonomists and North American tropical biologists.

At least eight insect species have been named after Hallwachs.

== Life and work ==
=== Early life and education ===
Winifred Hallwachs was born on October 11, 1954. She grew up in New York State and Philadelphia, Pennsylvania. In 1976, Hallwachs graduated from Princeton University with a BA in biochemistry. After Princeton, Hallwachs spent a year in Sweden. Her first trip to the tropics was to visit her sister in the Peace Corps in the Central African Republic.

Hallwachs returned to Philadelphia, where she enrolled in Daniel Janzen's "Habitat and Organisms" course at the University of Pennsylvania. The class addressed the natural history of tropical animal-plant interactions often drawing from Janzen's research in Guanacaste, a province in northwestern Costa Rica. Hallwachs joined Janzen as a volunteer on his next trip to Costa Rica. She has collaborated with him since 1978.

=== Early career and doctoral research ===
In Guanacaste, Hallwachs identified the animal-plant interaction that would become the focus of her doctoral research. Hallwachs' focused her early research on the Central American agoutis (Dasyprocta punctata) as seed hoarders and the details of their seed dispersers of the guapinol (Hymenaea courbaril: Leguminosae) and other primary forest trees. Agoutis are house-cat-sized forest rodents and the guapinol is a hardwood tree whose large and hard seeds were originally dispersed by now extinct tropical megafauna. Hallwachs fitted fruits with spools of thread to follow the trails of the agoutis to their secret hoards. She spent thousands of daylight hours observing them, collecting data for over five years. Hallwachs demonstrated that agoutis provided an essential method of secondary seed dispersal, by harvesting seeds which are found on the forest floor and preferentially burying larger ones in shallow caches outside the area of the parent plant. It is hypothesized that such plant species have adapted to the presence of scatterhoarding animals over evolutionary time.

To meet the needs of their biodiversity development initiatives, Hallwachs deferred completion of her PhD for a number of years. She finally completed her PhD in 1994 at Cornell University, with Pamela Parker as her thesis advisor. Her dissertation was In The Clumsy Dance Between Agoutis and Plants: Scatterhoarding by Costa Rican Dry Forest Agoutis (Dasyprocta punctata: Dasyproctidae: Rodentia) (1994, Cornell University).

=== Biodiversity development work ===
In 1985, realizing that widespread development in northwestern Costa Rica was rapidly decimating the forest in which they conducted their research, Hallwachs and Janzen expanded the focus of their work. Their goal was to achieve tropical forest restoration, expansion (through land purchases) and conservation, while continuing their scientific research at a reduced level.

They advocated for "biodiversity development" approaches that could support social integration of humans with the environment, and non-damaging uses of biodiversity. Their work at ACG is considered an exemplar of inclusive conservation, which emphasizes the connections between humans and nature in one ecosystem, and the involvement of local individuals in objectives for sustainability.

Although Janzen has often received more attention, as the outgoing spokesperson of the team, he emphasizes that their contributions are equal.

I see it more as we're two people, like Rodgers and Hammerstein, creating something; one of them thinks better, the other one plays the piano better. Or as I often put it, she thinks and I talk.

— Daniel Janzen

Among the important ongoing initiatives that Hallwachs and Janzen have developed in the area are:

- Caterpillar Inventory (1978–present)
- Biodiversity Development (1985–present)
- Parataxonomist Program (1985–present)
- Guanacaste Dry Forest Conservation Fund (GDFCF) (1997–present)
- DNA Barcoding (2003–present)
- BioAlfa bioliteracy project (2018–present)

In 1978, when Hallwachs began to work there, the Parque Nacional Santa Rosa included 100 km^{2} (25,000 acres) of pasture and relictual neotropical dry forest and 230 km^{2} (57,000 acres) of marine habitat. At that time it was the largest remaining area of dry tropical forest to be found in Mesoamerica. Over time it has been expanded and joined with further areas. As of 2019, the ACG consists of 169,000 hectares (420,000 acres). Hallwachs and Janzen have donated most of the award money that they have received to the expansion and maintenance of the ACG. The resulting national park connects habitats from the tops of volcanoes to the sea, including mid-elevation Caribbean rainforest as well as neotropical dry forest. In 1999, ACG was named a UNESCO World Heritage Site.

=== DNA barcoding initiative ===
The DNA barcoding initiative grew out of a meeting at Cold Spring Harbor Laboratory in 2003. There Janzen and Hallwachs met Paul Hebert, a geneticist from the University of Guelph who proposed the identification of species using mitochondrial DNA. Hebert focused on a section of 650 base pairs in the DNA sequence of the mitochondrial cytochrome c oxidase subunit I (COI) gene.

As of 2017, over 500,000 specimens representing more than 45,000 species from ACG had been barcoded using the Barcode of Life Data System (BOLD). In addition, barcoding has resulted in the identification of cryptic species of near-identical appearance that differ in terms of genetics and ecological niche. In 2004, the researchers published results showing that the butterfly Astraptes fulgerator was not a single species, but ten species. The documented number of species of Lepidoptera in ACG has risen from 9,000 to 15,000 as a result of the barcoding analysis program.

Hallwachs and Janzen support initiatives to gather DNA barcodes for all of the species in the world, through CBOL (Consortium for the Barcode of Life) and iBOL (International Barcode of Life).

=== Educational initiatives ===
Hallwachs and Janzen have been active in training North American tropical biologists. In 1965, Janzen designed an eight-week course for the Organization for Tropical Studies that has been taken by the majority of North American graduate students in tropical biology, and continues to be taught. During their class, students are hosted at ACG.

Hallwachs and Janzen are also engaged in the education of local children, using the area as a "living classroom" to promote both understanding and a sense of pride and guardianship. ACG has served as a demonstration site for students learning about ecological restoration and the conservation of the tropical dry forest since the 1980s.

In addition, they are deeply involved in the training and employment of Costa Ricans as field researchers. Since 1985, Hallwachs and Janzen have helped to train and work with resident parataxonomists, community‐based biodiversity inventory specialists who collect and process specimens and catalog biodiversity data. In an intentional initiative to redress gender imbalance, this has included the training and employment of women. Some women work with a husband as a partner, while others work independently.

In November 2017, Hallwachs gave the keynote address "Conservation, Onychorhynchus, and Female Parataxonomists" at the XXI Congress for the Mesoamerican Society for Biology and Conservation. She emphasized the importance of women working as parataxonomists.

== Insect species named in honor of Hallwachs ==
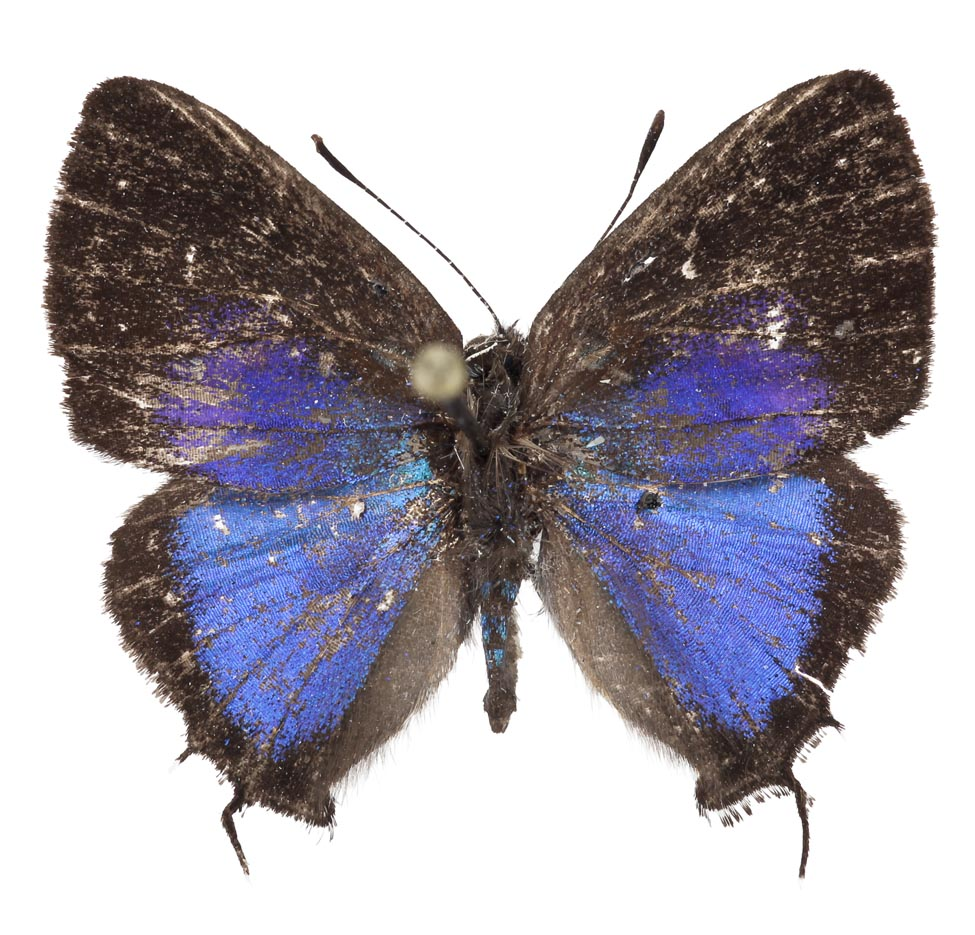
Lathecla winnie (Lycaenidae), courtesy of the Smithsonian Institution

Several insect species have been named in honor of Winnie Hallwachs including:

- Eomichla hallwachsae (Oechphoridae), Clarke, 1983. Recent barcoding results show that this is a complex of 3 species.
- Enicospilus hallwachsae (Ichneumonidae), Gauld, 1988.
- Paradirphia winifredae (Saturniidae), Lemaire & Wolfe, 1988. Barcoding results show that this has split into at least 5 species.
- Euhapigiodes hallwachsae (Notodontidae), Franclemont & J.S. Miller, 1997. Euhapigiodes hallwachsae turned out to be a synonym of Hapigiodes vazquezae, and the name was retracted.
- Omiodes hallwachsae (Crambidae), Gentili & Solis, 1998.
- Nemoria winniae (Geometridae) Pitkin, 1993.
- Eacles imperialis hallwachsae (Saturniidae), Brechlin & Meister, 2011.
- Lathecla winnie (Lycaenidae), Robbins & Busby, 2015.

== Awards ==
- 1993, Award for Improvement of Costa Rican Quality of Life, Universidad de Costa Rica (co award with D. Janzen).
- 2003, Award to Guanacaste Dry Forest Conservation Fund, Wege Foundation (co award with D. Janzen)
- 2006, Winner, National Outdoor Book Awards (NOBA), for 100 Caterpillars: Portraits from the Tropical Forests of Costa Rica (2006), Design & Artistic Merit Category.

== Selected works ==
=== Books co-authored ===
- Miller, J.C.; Janzen, D.H.; Hallwachs, W. (2006). 100 Caterpillars: Portraits from the Tropical Forests of Costa Rica. Cambridge, MA: Harvard University Press. ISBN 978-0-674-02334-5. 264 pp.
- Miller, J.C.; Janzen, D.H.; Hallwachs, W. (2007). 100 Butterflies and Moths: Portraits from the Tropical Forests of Costa Rica. Cambridge, MA: Harvard University Press. ISBN 978-0-674-02334-5. 256 pp.

=== Book chapters ===
- Hallwachs, W. (1983). "Bromelia pinguin and B. karatas (Chiras, Pinuelas)". In Janzen, D. H. (ed.). Costa Rican natural history. Chicago, Illinois: University of Chicago Press. pp. 195–197. ISBN 978-0-226-39334-6.
- Hallwachs, W. (1986). "Agoutis (Dasyprocta punctata): The Inheritors of Guapinol (Hymenaea courbaril: Leguminosae)". In Estrada, A.; Fleming, T. (eds.). Frugivores and seed dispersal. Tasks for vegetation science. Vol. 15. Dordrecht: Springer. pp. 285–304. doi:10.1007/978-94-009-4812-9_25. ISBN 978-94-010-8633-2.
- Hallwachs, W. (2010). "Forward". In Henderson, C. L. (ed.). Mammals, Amphibians, and Reptiles of Costa Rica: A Field Guide. Austin, Texas: University of Texas Press. pp. ix–x. ISBN 978-0-292-72274-3.
- Janzen, D. H.; Hallwachs, W. (2016). "Biodiversity Conservation History and Future in Costa Rica: The Case of Area de Conservacion Guanacaste (ACG). Chapter 10". In Kappelle, M. (ed.). Costa Rican Ecosystems. Chicago, Illinois: University of Chicago Press. pp. 290–341. ISBN 978-0-226-27893-3.

=== Scientific publications ===
- Janzen, D. H.; Hallwachs, W. (1992). "Training parataxonomists for Costa Rica's national biodiversity inventory: the experiences of the first female course". Report to the Instituto Nacional de Biodiversidad (INBio). 46 pp.
- Janzen, Daniel H. (February 12, 2004). "Setting up tropical biodiversity for conservation through non-damaging use: participation by parataxonomists". Journal of Applied Ecology. 41 (1): 181–187. Bibcode:2004JApEc..41..181J. doi:10.1111/j.1365-2664.2004.00879.x.
- Hebert, P. D. N.; Penton, E. H.; Burns, J. M.; Janzen, D. H.; Hallwachs, W. (October 1, 2004). "Ten species in one: DNA barcoding reveals cryptic species in the neotropical skipper butterfly Astraptes fulgerator". Proceedings of the National Academy of Sciences. 101 (41): 14812–14817. Bibcode:2004PNAS..10114812H. doi:10.1073/pnas.0406166101. PMC 522015. PMID 15465915.
- Smith, M. A.; Woodley, N. E.; Janzen, D. H.; Hallwachs, W.; Hebert, P. D. N. (February 27, 2006). "DNA barcodes reveal cryptic host-specificity within the presumed polyphagous members of a genus of parasitoid flies (Diptera: Tachinidae)". Proceedings of the National Academy of Sciences. 103 (10): 3657–3662. doi:10.1073/pnas.0511318103. PMC 1383497. PMID 16505365.
- Janzen, D. H.; Hallwachs, W.; Burns, J. M. (June 14, 2010). "A tropical horde of counterfeit predator eyes". Proceedings of the National Academy of Sciences. 107 (26): 11659–11665. Bibcode:2010PNAS..10711659J. doi:10.1073/pnas.0912122107. PMC 2900645. PMID 20547863.
- Janzen, Daniel H.; Hallwachs, Winnie (August 16, 2011). "Joining Inventory by Parataxonomists with DNA Barcoding of a Large Complex Tropical Conserved Wildland in Northwestern Costa Rica". PLOS ONE. 6 (8) e18123. Bibcode:2011PLoSO...618123J. doi:10.1371/journal.pone.0018123. PMC 3156711. PMID 21857894.
- Janzen, Daniel H.; Hallwachs, Winnie (September 2016). "DNA barcoding the Lepidoptera inventory of a large complex tropical conserved wildland, Area de Conservacion Guanacaste, northwestern Costa Rica". Genome. 59 (9): 641–660. doi:10.1139/gen-2016-0005. PMID 27584861.
- Miller, Scott E.; Hausmann, Axel; Hallwachs, Winnie; Janzen, Daniel H. (September 5, 2016). "Advancing taxonomy and bioinventories with DNA barcodes". Philosophical Transactions of the Royal Society B: Biological Sciences. 371 (1702) 20150339. doi:10.1098/rstb.2015.0339. PMC 4971191. PMID 27481791.
- Ge, Dengteng; Wu, Gaoxiang; Yang, Lili; Kim, Hye-Na; Hallwachs, Winnie; Burns, John M.; Janzen, Daniel H.; Yang, Shu (July 11, 2017). "Varying and unchanging whiteness on the wings of dusk-active and shade-inhabiting Carystoides escalantei butterflies". Proceedings of the National Academy of Sciences. 114 (28): 7379–7384. Bibcode:2017PNAS..114.7379G. doi:10.1073/pnas.1701017114. PMC 5514718. PMID 28652351.
- Chacón, I. A.; Janzen, D. H.; Hallwachs, W.; Dapkey, T.; Harvey, D. J.; Grishin, N.V. (2017). "Six new cryptic species of Xylodonta Becker, 2014 (Notodontidae: Nystaleinae) from Costa Rica". Tropical Lepidoptera Research. 27 (1): 33–58.
- Janzen, Daniel H.; Burns, John M.; Cong, Qian; Hallwachs, Winnie; Dapkey, Tanya; Manjunath, Ramya; Hajibabaei, Mehrdad; Hebert, Paul D. N.; Grishin, Nick V. (August 1, 2017). "Nuclear genomes distinguish cryptic species suggested by their DNA barcodes and ecology". Proceedings of the National Academy of Sciences. 114 (31): 8313–8318. Bibcode:2017PNAS..114.8313J. doi:10.1073/pnas.1621504114. PMC 5547596. PMID 28716927.
- Treuer, Timothy L. H.; Choi, Jonathan J.; Janzen, Daniel H.; Hallwachs, Winnie; Peréz-Aviles, Daniel; Dobson, Andrew P.; Powers, Jennifer S.; Shanks, Laura C.; Werden, Leland K.; Wilcove, David S. (March 2018). "Low-cost agricultural waste accelerates tropical forest regeneration". Restoration Ecology. 26 (2): 275–283. Bibcode:2018ResEc..26..275T. doi:10.1111/rec.12565. S2CID 36585698.
- Sharkey, Michael J.; Penteado-Dias, Angélica Maria; Smith, M. Alex; Hallwachs, Winnie; Janzen, Daniel (February 25, 2019). "Synopsis of New World Sigalphinae (Hymenoptera, Braconidae) with the description of two new species and a key to genera". Journal of Hymenoptera Research. 68: 1–11. doi:10.3897/jhr.68.30131. hdl:10214/29784.
- Janzen, Daniel H.; Hallwachs, Winnie (May 2019). "Perspective: Where might be many tropical insects?". Biological Conservation. 233: 102–108. Bibcode:2019BCons.233..102J. doi:10.1016/j.biocon.2019.02.030. S2CID 91584582.
- Fleming, AJ; Wood, D. Monty; Smith, M. Alex; Dapkey, Tanya; Hallwachs, Winnie; Janzen, Daniel (June 28, 2019). "Twenty-two new species in the genus Hyphantrophaga Townsend (Diptera: Tachinidae) from Area de Conservación Guanacaste, with a key to the species of Mesoamerica". Biodiversity Data Journal. 7 e29553. doi:10.3897/BDJ.7.e29553. PMC 6611774. PMID 31308823.
