= Jennifer Powers =

Jennifer Powers may refer to:

- Jennifer Sarah Powers American ecologist and professor at the University of Minnesota
- Jenny Powers American actress
