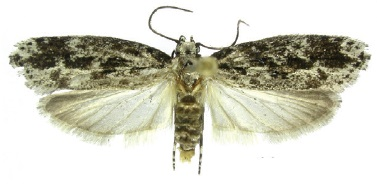

Scientific classification
- Domain: Eukaryota
- Kingdom: Animalia
- Phylum: Arthropoda
- Class: Insecta
- Order: Lepidoptera
- Family: Depressariidae
- Genus: Ethmia
- Species: E. randycurtisi

Binomial name
- Ethmia randycurtisi Phillips, 2014

= Ethmia randycurtisi =

Species of moth

Ethmia randycurtisi is a moth in the family Depressariidae. It is found in Costa Rica, where it has been recorded from the Cordillera Volcánica de Tilarán and Cordillera Volcánica Central al altitudes ranging from 1,200 to 1,600 meters (3,900 to 5,200 ft).

The length of the forewings is 13.3–13.4 mm (0.52–0.53 in) for males and 13.3–15.5 mm (0.52–0.61 in) for females. The ground color of the forewings is whitish with a series of elongated dark markings. The hindwing ground colour is whitish, but pale brown towards the margin.

== Etymology ==
The species is named in honor of Randy Curtis for his continuous encouragement, financial support and advice on behalf of Instituto Nacional de Biodiversidad's beginning in Santo Domingo de Heredia.
