= Regions of Slovakia =

Regions of Slovakia Kraje Slovenska (Slovak)
- Category: Unitary state
- Location: Slovak Republic
- Number: 8 Regions
- Populations: 562,000 (Trnava) – 810,000 (Prešov)
- Areas: 2,052.6 km^{2} (792.5 sq mi) (Bratislava) – 9,454.8 km^{2} (3,650.5 sq mi) (Banská Bystrica)
- Government: Region government, National government
- Subdivisions: District

Since 1949 (except 1990–1996), Slovakia has been divided into a number of kraje (singular kraj; usually translated as "Regions" with capital R). Their number, borders and functions have been changed several times. There are eight regions of Slovakia and they correspond to the EU's NUTS 3 level of local administrative units. Each kraj consists of okresy (counties or districts), which are further divided into obce (municipalities). There are 79 districts.

== List ==
After a period without kraje and without any equivalent (1990–1996), the kraje were reintroduced in 1996. As for administrative division, Slovakia has been subdivided into 8 kraje since 31 December 2025:

Flag	Arms	Region	Capital	Population (2025)	Area (km^{2})	Density	NUTS level 3	Seats in Regional Council
		Bratislava	Bratislava	739,635	2052.60	358.76	SK010	50
		Trnava	Trnava	565,462	4146.28	136.37	SK021	40
		Trenčín	Trenčín	562,536	4501.81	124.95	SK022	47
		Nitra	Nitra	661,995	6343.71	104.35	SK023	54
		Žilina	Žilina	684,190	6808.40	100.49	SK031	57
		Banská Bystrica	Banská Bystrica	607,581	9453.96	64.26	SK032	49
		Prešov	Prešov	810,075	8972.65	90.28	SK041	62
		Košice	Košice	777,933	6754.27	115.17	SK042	57
Total				5,409,407	49,033.72	110.32		416

Since 2002, Slovakia is divided into 8 samosprávne kraje (self-governing regions), which are called by the Constitution vyššie územné celky (Higher Territorial Units), abbr. VÚC. The territory and borders of the self-governing regions are identical with the territory and borders of the kraje. Therefore, the word "kraj" can be replaced by "VÚC" or "samosprávny kraj" in each case in the above list. The main difference is that organs of samosprávne kraje are self-governing, with an elected chairperson and assembly, while the organs of kraje are appointed by the government.

== Name ==
The term "Region" (Slovak: kraj) should not be confused with:

- the general (i.e. non-administrative) term "region" (Slovak: región) as it is used for example in the articles List of traditional regions of Slovakia or List of tourism regions of Slovakia
- the 4 "regions" (Slovak: regióny or oblasti or zoskupenia krajov) that correspond to the NUTS 2 level, i.e. groups of several kraje, used by the Eurostat for statistical purposes. These are:
  - Bratislava region (statistical) SK 01 (Bratislava Region) – comprises only this single region
  - Západné Slovensko SK 02 (Western Slovakia) – Trnava, Trenčín and Nitra
  - Stredné Slovensko SK 03 (Central Slovakia) – Žilina and Banská Bystrica
  - Východné Slovensko SK 04 (Eastern Slovakia) – Prešov and Košice

== History ==
=== Prior to 1949 ===
Historically, Slovakia was not divided into kraje, but into counties (Slovak: župy or stolice). This was the case when present-day Slovakia was part of:

- Great Moravia (c. 9th century)
- Kingdom of Hungary (c. 11th/12th century – 1918)
- Czechoslovakia (the župy existed 1918 – 1928)
- the WWII Slovak Republic (the župy existed 1940 – 1945)

In 1928–1939 (and formally also 1945–1948), Slovakia as a whole formed the administrative unit "Slovak land" (Krajina slovenská) within Czechoslovakia.

=== 24 December 1948/1 January 1949 – 30 June 1960 ===
- Bratislavský kraj (Bratislava Region)
- Banskobystrický kraj (Banská Bystrica Region)
- Košický kraj (Košice Region)
- Nitriansky kraj (Nitra Region)
- Prešovský kraj (Prešov Region)
- Žilinský kraj (Žilina Region)

Each kraj was named after its principal city.

=== 1 July 1960 – 19 December 1990 ===
- Stredoslovenský kraj (Central Slovak Region)
- Východoslovenský kraj (Eastern Slovak Region)
- Západoslovenský kraj (Western Slovak Region)
- Bratislava (before 22 March 1968, part of the Západoslovenský kraj, afterwards a partly separate entity; from January 1971 a separate kraj)

Note: The kraje were abolished from 1 July 1969, until 28 December 1970, when they were reintroduced.

== Traditional regions ==
There are also other regions in Slovakia, which do not correspond to historical counties:

Region	Former County part	Former County
Kysuce	northern	Žilina
Záhorie	western	Nitra
Záhorie	western	Bratislava
Podpoľanie	southern	Zvolen
Zamagurie	northern	Spiš

== See also ==
- List of tourism regions of Slovakia
- Districts of Slovakia
- List of country subdivision flags in Europe § Slovakia
- ISO 3166-2:SK
- List of counties of the Kingdom of Hungary located in Slovakia
