= List of counties of the Kingdom of Hungary located in Slovakia =

This is a list of counties of the Kingdom of Hungary, which are fully or partially located in present-day Slovakia.

The territory of present-day Slovakia was part of the Kingdom of Hungary until 1920. See History of Slovakia.

== Counties that are completely incorporated in Slovakia ==
There were 20 (earlier 21) counties of the Kingdom of Hungary situated completely or partly in present-day Slovakia. After the creation of Czechoslovakia, they continued to exist until 1922. Most are still referred to informally.

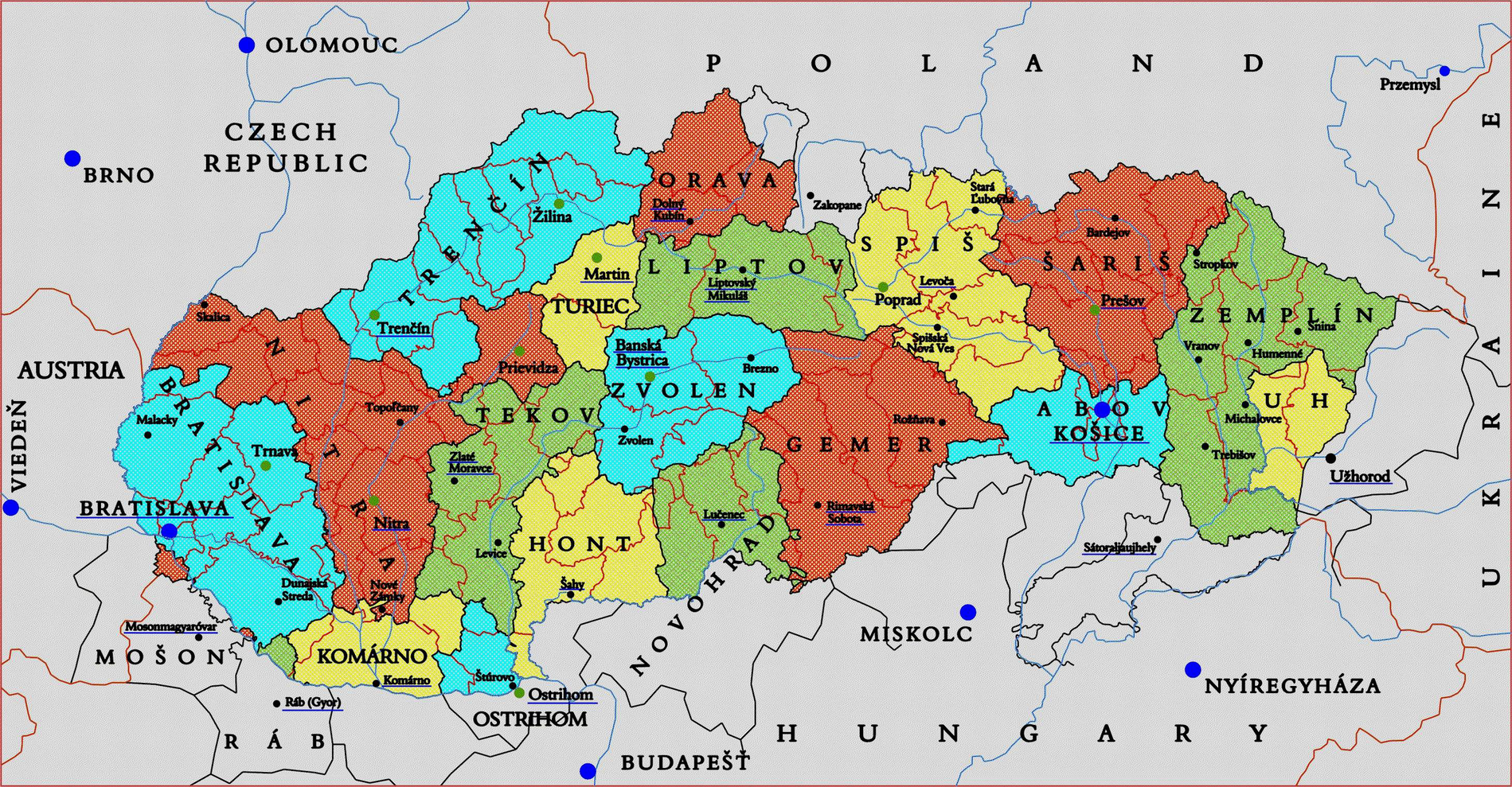
Map of historical counties of Slovakia

Slovak name	Hungarian county
Nitra	Nyitra County
Tekov	Bars County
Trenčín	Trencsén County
Turiec	Turóc County
Liptov	Liptó County
Zvolen	Zólyom County
Šariš	Sáros County

== Counties that are partly included in Slovakia ==
Slovak	Hungarian	Territory note
Mošoň	Moson County	almost wholly in present-day Hungary
Prešporok (today's Bratislava)	Pozsony County	almost wholly in Slovakia
Gemer-Malohont	Gömör-Kishont County	almost wholly in Slovakia
Ráb	Győr County	almost wholly in present-day Hungary
Komárno	Komárom County	southern part in present-day Hungary
Ostrihom	Esztergom County	southern part in present-day Hungary
Hont	Hont County	almost wholly in Slovakia
Novohrad	Nógrád County	southern part in present-day Hungary
Abov-Turňa	Abaúj-Torna County	southern part in present-day Hungary
Zemplín	Zemplén County	southern part in Hungary
Uh	Ung County	eastern part in Ukraine
Orava	Árva County	northern part annexed by Poland in 1920
Spiš	Szepes County	northern part annexed by Poland in 1920

== See also ==
- List of historic counties of Hungary
- List of tourism regions of Slovakia
- Regions of Slovakia
