= Tropical ecology =

Study of the relationships between the biotic and abiotic components of the tropics

Tropical ecology is the study of the relationships between the biotic and abiotic components of the tropics, or the area of the Earth that lies between the Tropic of Cancer and the Tropic of Capricorn (23.4378° N and 23.4378° S, respectively). The tropical climate experiences hot, humid weather and rainfall year-round. While many might associate the region solely with the rainforests, the tropics are home to a wide variety of ecosystems that boast a great wealth of biodiversity, from exotic animal species to seldom-found flora. Tropical ecology began with the work of early English naturalists and eventually saw the establishment of research stations throughout the tropics devoted to exploring and documenting these exotic landscapes. The burgeoning ecological study of the tropics has led to increased conservation education and programs devoted to the climate. Tropical ecology provides a wealth of natural resources to humans, this includes contributing to the carbon cycle, with the ability to store 50% of carbon emissions as well as turnover 40% of global oxygen. However, despite the natural services provided by tropical ecology, deforestation is a threat of tropical rainforests. Any plant of interest can be exploited for commercial reasons and extraction of these specific plant species can be at a rapid rate without time for healthy regeneration. Most of the global plant biodiversity is hosted in tropical areas, however studies in this area is mostly covered by scientist from Northern countries. Inclusion of scientist from countries where rainforest is present is heavily encouraged because it extends global knowledge and research which advances scientific contributions, benefiting tropical ecology.

== Origins ==
The roots of tropical ecology can be traced to the voyages of European naturalists in the late 19th and early 20th centuries. Men who might be considered early ecologists such as Alexander Von Humboldt, Thomas Belt, Henry Walter Bates, and even Charles Darwin sailed to tropical locations and wrote extensively about the exotic flora and fauna they encountered. While many naturalists were simply drawn to the exotic nature of the tropics, some historians argue that the naturalists conducted their studies on tropical islands in order to increase the likelihood that their work might bring about social and political change. In any case, these early explorations and the subsequent writings that came from them comprise much of the early work of tropical ecology and served to spark further interest in the tropics among other naturalists. Henry Walter Bates, for example, wrote extensively about a species of toucan he encountered while traveling along the Amazon River.Bates discovered that if one toucan called out, the other surrounding toucans would mimic his or her call, and the forest would quickly fill with the sounds of toucans; this was one of the first documented studies of animal mimicry. Alexander Von Humboldt voyaged throughout South America, from Venezuela through the Andes Mountains. There, Humboldt and his associate, Aimé Bonpland, stumbled upon an interesting ecological concept. As the pair traveled from the base of the mountains to the peak, they noticed that the species of plants and animals would change according to which climatic zone they were in relative to their elevation. This simple discovery aided the theorization of the life zone concept, which would eventually give way to the popularization of the concept of ecosystems. Another voyager, William Beebe, researched many species of birds in tropical locations and published a large gamut of academic works on his findings that greatly shaped the field of ornithology. According to his biographer Carol Grant Gould, "The effects William Beebe had on science... are enormous and lasting. He made an effective transition between the Victorian natural historian, content to collect and classify the natural world, and the modern experimental biologist." The work of these early pioneers not only lead to an increased interest in the burgeoning field of tropical ecology, but also had far reaching implications for scientific study on the whole. In recent years, notable changes have arose with tropical savannah ecosystems being one of these them since it has become a significant global biome but at the price of tropical forest ecosystems.

== Conservation and management ==
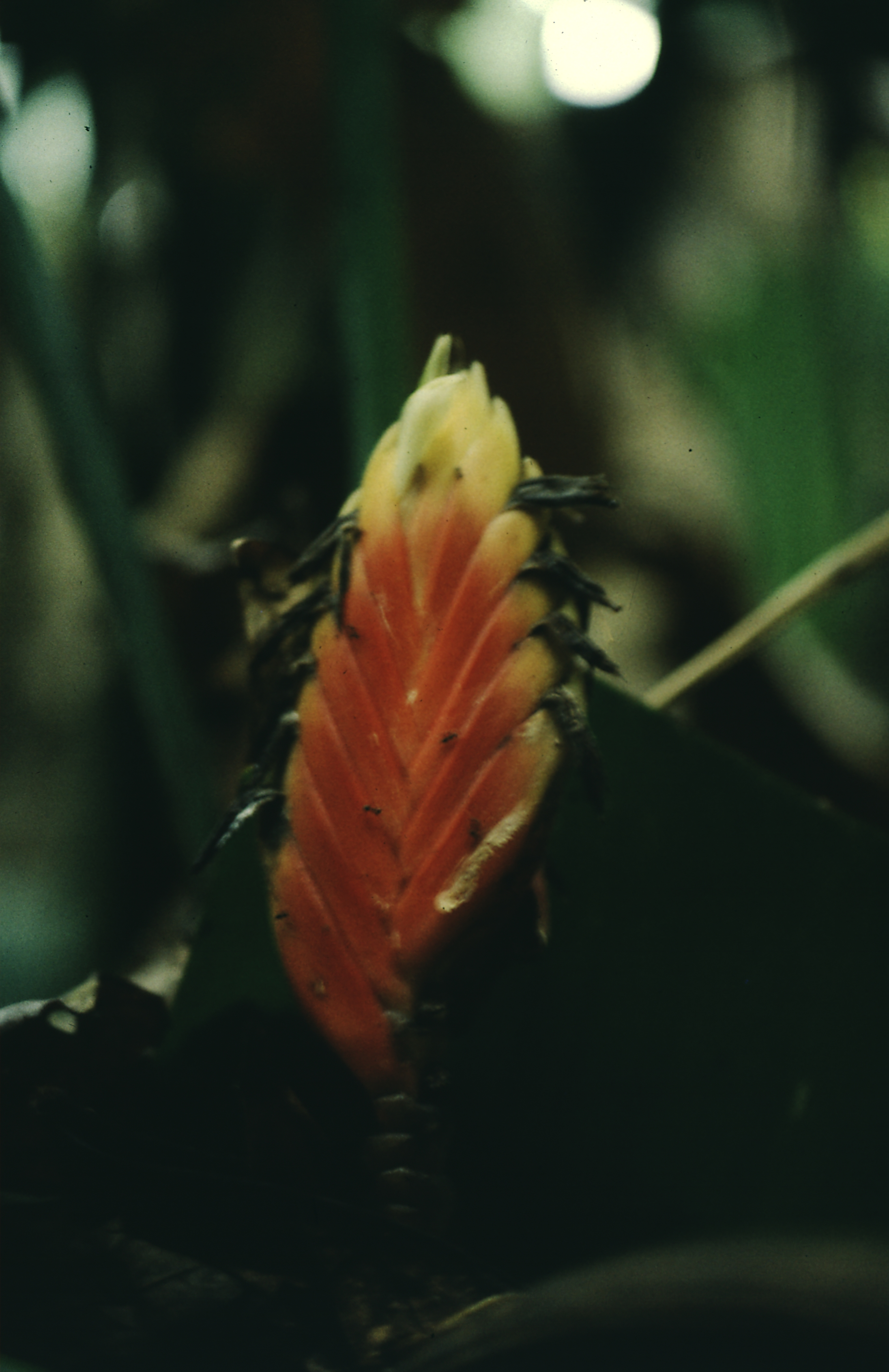
Tropical blossom in the Ecuadorian rainforest

Tropical regions are hotspots for biodiversity, so conservation efforts are essential to focus on in these places. Many species can be observed and conserved in the tropics. The tropics receive much attention when it comes to conservation and management due to increased public awareness of the significance of tropical ecosystems and the delicacy with which they must be treated. For instance, in tropical grassy biomes, it was determined that the fauna of certain areas or regions have been observed to have multiple endemic species, which provide some insight into the age and origin of mainly tropical grassy systems. Conservation efforts in the tropics can be challenging to start, as many communities have developed a culture around the ecology in many locations. In many cases, people make their livelihood off some aspect of the ecology. Conservation measures have multiple benefits to the ecosystem and the community. There are health, economic, and environmental benefits to conserving tropical ecosystems, and conserving these benefits requires communication between local people, governments, and stakeholders. Communication between these groups facilitates the most benefit from conserving tropical ecosystems. Therefore, losing the tropics would result in losing multiple biodiversity species and local communities, natural processes, and even specific organisms that rely on them, which would face repercussions.

The rainforests are subjects of heightened attention due to the excessive deforestation and logging that occurs in those ecosystems. As well as anthropogenic disturbances such as fires, hunting and trapping of organisms that play key roles in tropical biodiversity and natural processes. Deforestation contributes to CO_{2} emissions, which is a cause of climate change. Specifically, because the microclimate is altered as a consequence to persisting carbon emissions after deforestation. Much of the deforestation in the tropics is the result of agricultural land use. Examples of this can be seen in Brazil where deforestation occurs to boast cattle ranching, 80% of deforestation can be linked to cattle ranching causing species loss. This indicates that tropical forest protected areas are becoming some of the last safe heavens for threatened species. In the 1980s, the United Nations Food and Agriculture Organization conducted a study that concluded that 15.4 million hectares (100 acres) of tropical forest was lost per year. In addition, 5.6 million hectares were logged each year. This landmark study sparked widespread interest in the tropical ecosystem, and a great number of non-profits and outspoken ecologists engaged in an extended fight to "save the rainforest" that continues today. This battle has manifested itself in a number of ways, one of which is the outcropping of biodiversity institutes in tropical locations dedicated to stopping the excessive deforestation of the landscape, one of the most notable of which was established in Costa Rica. The work of the Costa Rican National Biodiversity Institute (INBio) has served as a model for other biodiversity institutes. First, rainforests harbor the most alkaloid-producing plants of any biome; alkaloids are compounds that are crucial to the production of Western drugs. Due to the abundance of these compounds, pharmaceutical companies all over the world look to the rainforests for new medicinal treatments. In the early 1990s, the heads of INBio signed a deal with the pharmaceutical behemoth Merck that called for cooperation between the two entities in discovering and exploring new natural treatments in the Costa Rican rainforests. However, humans should tread carefully as to not cause species loss as a result of overexploitation, since human impacts have been a leading contributor to disturbances and modified land. Ecologists, government officials, and corporations alike praised this decision as decisive progress in an ongoing struggle to work cooperatively in utilizing tropical biodiversity while ensuring the stability of tropical ecosystems.

== Historical biogeography of the tropics ==
Tropical ecology has changed over time as a result of dynamic biogeography. Biogeography is the geographical distribution of plants and animals, and has a large impact on the course of evolution. Understanding the historical biogeography of the tropics is important for learning about the origins of biodiversity. Evolution around the world is impacted by the changing species distribution across tropical biomes because many species can be traced back to tropical ancestors. Species evolve rapidly in the tropics, changing the habitat ecology. The theory of a latitudinal species gradient suggests that species richness increases towards the equator for most taxa. This holds true for marine and terrestrial species, northern and southern located species, ectotherms and endotherms and active and passive dispersing species. By turning to the biogeographical history of the tropics, we gain a deeper understanding of how the current tropical ecology developed.

Biogeography is related to the physical conditions and geography of the habitat. The temperature and geographical area of the tropics enforce the latitudinal species gradients by facilitating higher rates of speciation. Tropical biomes are defined as warm, moist habitats, and cover the largest amount of the terrestrial area on earth. Tropical species do not face the evolutionary pressure of harsh climates experienced in northern and southern regions. Therefore, tropical adaptations are largely influenced by biotic interactions as opposed to climate pressures. Consequently, tropical evolution has been described as a "creative process" among biota rather than a survival process against the climate. Some hypotheses also suggest that the higher tropical temperatures affect speciation at the molecular level, leading to higher mutation rates, faster generation times and therefore faster rates of genetic divergence. The West Pacific Coral Triangle, a tropical ocean region, is the global peak of marine diversity because of its combination of warm temperatures, large area, minimal seasonal climate variation, diverse habitat types, important biotic relationships and influx of taxi from other tropical regions because of a complex mainland-island structure and ocean currents.

Islands make up much of the geography in the tropical region. The tropics are a biodiversity hotspot. Species migrate to islands and are able to create new communities and grow and change with their new environments. The Equilibrium Theory of Island Biogeography, coined by MacArthur and Wilson in a 1963 article explains that biodiversity on an island is related to the size of the island. Biodiversity increases as the size of the land mass increases and decreases as the size decreases. The theory also states that the biodiversity on islands increases the closer the island is to the mainland.

=== Tropical glacial and interglacial periods ===
The geography and biology of the tropics has the longest history of any biome found on Earth today. Tropical glacial and interglacial cycles caused by a fluctuating climate have induced speciation in the tropics, explaining its outstanding ecological diversity. Nevertheless, the tropics have experienced various climatic disturbances over their long history that have shaped present patterns of diversity.

The Paleocene period experienced warm air and water temperatures, with tropical terrestrial biomes reaching as far north as current day London and tropical seas extending into the arctic. The Paleocene period was the first epoch of the Cenozoic era, spanning from 66 - 56 million years ago. During this period, the temperature gradient from the equator to the poles was extremely reduced. Cooling trends began about 45 million years ago, with interspersed warm periods. During this period, species diversification increased because tropical biomes became fragmented by glaciers, increasing rates of speciation. This cooling also gradually restricted the ranges of many taxa into shrinking tropical regions. The geographic and temperate history of the Cenozoic period is reflected in tropical ecology and more specifically the latitudinal species gradient. Tropical species have experienced a longer and less disturbed evolutionary history than species found in other biomes around the world. Therefore, temperate species that initially radiated out of tropical biomes are often nested in the phylogenies of tropical clades. The consistency of tropical environments constitutes species composition with more age variance and diversity.

The Quaternary glacial cycles that occurred during the Pleistocene era were the most recent major climate disturbance in the tropics. Glaciers caused the decline of life forms at high altitudes because they remained solid for the longest consecutive time at high altitudes. Tropical environments became interspersed by glaciers and dry climates. This fragmentation resulted in speciation due to geographic isolation, steepening the latitudinal species gradient. Today, Peru contains 70% of all tropical glacial area, hosting the two largest tropical glaciers: the Quelccaya Ice Cap and the Nevado Coropuna ice cap. Monitoring the shrinkage of these glaciers is important for understanding the rate of glacial melt. From 1998 to 2020, 26% of the Quelccaya ice cap melted and the average altitude of the ice cap rose from 5389 meters to 5449 meters. The degree of change in tropical glacial areas is rapidly accelerating. Future research aims to understand current glaciation trends in the tropics in order to give context to the relationship between tropical ecology and climate change.

== Significance of ecology in the tropics ==
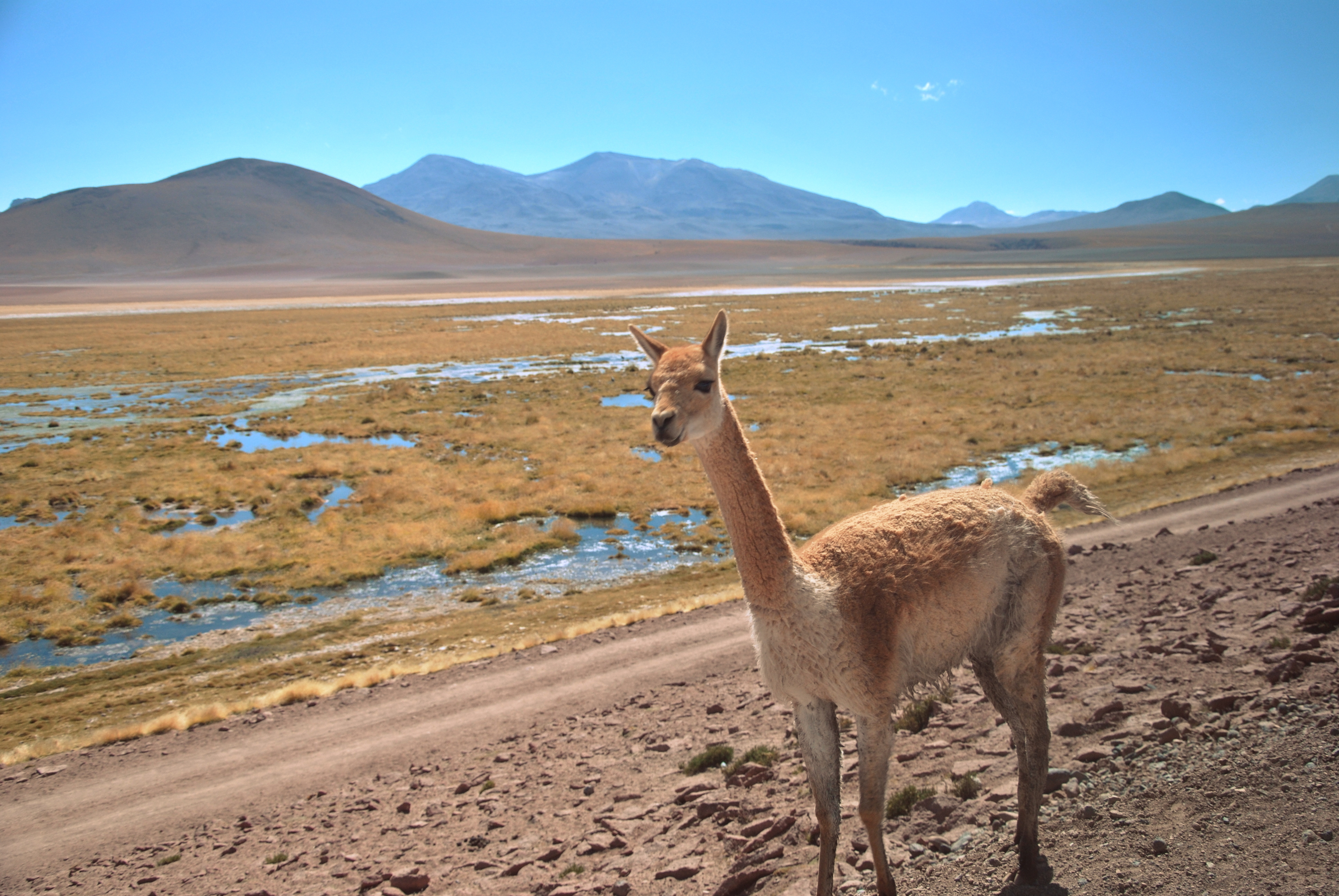
Vicuña Atacama, Chile

It is advantageous for ecologists and naturalists to study plants, animals, and ecosystems in the tropical climate for a number of reasons. For one, the tropics are home to a wide array of ecosystems, from rainforests to deserts. In that sense, the tropics are a great place for ecologists to conduct diverse studies without traveling too far from a research center. With the large amount of biodiversity present in the tropics, it is a good access point for research. Most research in the tropics has been done on species richness, however more research needs to be done on other aspects of the tropics. For example, studying tropical plant communities could be used to examine their impacts or responses to elevated carbon dioxide. Secondly, the temperature in the tropics rarely hinders plant growth and activity; flora can be studied nearly year round, as cold weather never stunts plant activity. Which has proven to be useful in observing things such as flowering rhythmicity and leaf change. In addition to climatic reasons, the traditionally sparse population of the tropics has greatly aided research in the area, as the landscape is largely untainted by mankind and machinery. While this may not be the case so much as of late, the vast amounts of untapped land in the tropics still make for prime research territory. Another example would be how studying lowland tropical rainforest can provide researchers with some insight into how hydrological and geomorphological processes have significant impacts on the ecosystem. Finally, the tropics are valuable to ecologists because they are home to some of the oldest lands on Earth, including Chile's Atacama Desert and Australia's Peneplain. Thus, plant communities have been growing and evolving for millions of uninterrupted years, which makes for interesting study. That being said, while it may be advantageous to study ecology in the tropics, this is not to say that it is without difficulty. The ecosystems native to the tropics and the biodiversity they boast are dwindling. Half of the species located in biodiversity hotspots are in danger of extinction, and many of the plants with potential medicinal uses are dying off. In this sense, ecological study in the tropics is not as easily conducted as it once was; this is the reason why much of the modern ecological work in the field is aimed towards conservation and management as opposed to general research.
