= Discover Life in America =

Discover Life in America is a non-profit NGO founded in 1998. It is based in Great Smoky Mountain National Park, and is located near the mountain resort city of Gatlinburg in Sevier County, Tennessee. The primary function of DLIA is to help administer the All Taxa Biodiversity Inventory, a joint effort with scientists and volunteers worldwide to create an inventory of all the living species located in the park. This has been cited as one of the largest efforts of its kind, and has been compared to such efforts as the human genome project in terms of scope and potential effect on the study of biodiversity. Since it had been established, 922 species new to science and 7,391 species new to the park have been added to the ATBI. There is an estimated 80,000 species currently in Great Smoky Mountains National Park.

== Origin ==
The first attempt at an All Taxa Biodiversity Inventory was conducted by Daniel Janzen in the Guanacaste State of Costa Rica. Due to several political and financial reasons, though, the effort failed in 1996. In December 1997, a large group of scientists and interested administrators and educators gathered in Gatlinburg, Tennessee, to discuss starting an ATBI for the Great Smoky Mountains National Park. Soon after the meeting in December 1997, Discover Life in America was created as the administrative organization for the ATBI of the Great Smoky Mountain National Park. This was because the Great Smoky Mountains is considered to have some of the most diverse habitats in the world. The scientists gathered originally estimated that there were 99,000 species of life and in 1998 only about 10% of that estimate were known species. DLIA was formed to coordinate research with the park’s administration, and to allow for fundraising and the collection of tax-exempt donations.

== Work and research ==
DLIA currently has one full-time employee, and two part-timers. They rely heavily on the aid of volunteers and interns year-round. With respect to the ATBI, DLIA works with scientists to both encourage interest in the national park’s biodiversity and provide them with resources to aid their research. DLIA maintains a mini-grant program to help fund research relevant to the ATBI and their mission. Other resources DLIA provides for scientists include the arranging of volunteers, arranging housing and general logistics for researchers, and providing lab space and necessary equipment for both fieldwork and lab use.

== Science advisory panel ==
A science advisory panel is organized for DLIA in order to provide advice and support to the NGO. The panel currently consists of Dr. Sylvie Earle of National Geographic, Dr. Dan Janzen from the University of Pennsylvania, Dr. Thomas Lovejoy of the Heinz Center, Dr. Ron Pulliam from the University of Georgia, Dr. Peter Raven of the Missouri Botanical Garden, and Dr. Edward O. Wilson from Harvard University.

== See also ==
- All-taxa biodiversity inventory
- Great Smoky Mountains National Park
