= Parataxonomy =

Parataxonomy is a system of labor division for use in biodiversity research, in which the rough sorting tasks of specimen collection, field identification, documentation and preservation are conducted by primarily local, less specialized individuals, thereby alleviating the workload for the "alpha" or "master" taxonomist. Parataxonomy may be used to improve taxonomic efficiency by enabling more expert taxonomists to restrict their activity to the tasks that require their specialist knowledge and skills, which has the potential to expedite the rate at which new taxa may be described and existing taxa may be sorted and discussed. Parataxonomists generally work in the field, sorting collected samples into recognizable taxonomic units (RTUs) based on easily recognized features. The process can be used alone for rapid assessment of biodiversity.

Some researchers consider reliance on parataxonomist-generated data to be prone to error depending on the sample, the sorter and the group of organisms in question. Therefore, quantitative studies based on parataxonomic processes may be unreliable and is therefore controversial. The concepts of citizen science and parataxonomy are somewhat overlapping, with unclear distinctions between those employed to provide supplemental services to taxonomists and those who do so voluntarily, whether for personal enrichment or the altruistic desire to make substantive scientific contributions. These terms are occasionally used interchangeably, but some taxonomists maintain that each possess unique differences.

== History of concept ==
A "parataxonomist" is a term coined by Dr. Daniel Janzen and Dr. Winnie Hallwachs in the late 1980s who used it to describe the role of assistants working at INBio in Costa Rica. It describes a person who collects specimens for ecological studies as well as the basic information for a specimen as it is being collected in the field. Information they collect includes date, location (lat/long), collector's name, the species of plant and caterpillar if known, and each specimen is assigned a unique voucher code. The term was a play on the word "paramedic", someone who can operate independently, may not have a specialized university degree, but has some taxonomic training.

Hallwachs and Janzen created and implemented an intensive six-month course that taught everything from taxonomy to how to operate a chainsaw. Dr. Janzen trained the first cohort in January 1989, additional cohorts receiving training up until 1992. From 1992 onward, all other training was conducted by parataxonomists. As of 2017, some 10,000 new species in the Area de Conservacion Guanacaste have been identified thanks to the efforts of parataxonomists.

During the time period that Janzen's parataxonomic model was in place, INBio became the second largest biological collection in Latin America with over 3.5 million collections, all of which were digitized. As of 2015, the institute had produced over 2,500 scientific articles, 250 books and 316 conventions. Its website logged an average of 25,000 unique visitors daily from 125 countries, and its park had received upwards of 15 million visitors.

== See also ==
- Folk taxonomy
- Citizen science
