= List of tourism regions of Slovakia =

The following is a list of official tourism regions in Slovakia:

== Division until 2004 ==
The districts (okresy) completely or partly included in the regions are indicated in parentheses:

- Bratislava and its surroundings (Bratislava, Malacky, Pezinok, Senec)
- Záhorie (Malacky, Myjava, Senica, Skalica)
- Podunajsko [ Danube River region] (Dunajská Streda, Galanta, Komárno, Nové Zámky, Šaľa)
- Považie [ Váh region] (Hlohovec, Nové Mesto n/Váhom, Piešťany, Trenčín, Trnava)
- Horné Považie Upper Váh region (Bytča, Ilava, Považská Bystrica, Púchov, Žilina)
- Ponitrie [ Nitra River region] (Bánovce nad Bebravou, Nitra, Partizánske, Prievidza, Šaľa, Topoľčany, Zlaté Moravce)
- Kysuce (Čadca, Kysucké Nové Mesto)
- Orava (Dolný Kubín, Námestovo, Tvrdošín)
- Turiec (Martin, Turčianske Teplice)
- Horehronie [ Upper Hron River region] (Banská Bystrica, Brezno)
- Pohronie [ Hron River region] (Banská Štiavnica, Levice, Zlaté Moravce, Žarnovica, Žiar n/Hronom)
- Podpoľanie [ Territory below the Poľana Mountains] (Detva, Krupina, Zvolen)
- Novohrad (Levice, Lučenec, Poltár, Veľký Krtíš)
- Gemer (Revúca, Rimavská Sobota, Rožňava)
- Liptov (Liptovský Mikuláš, Ružomberok)
- Tatras (Kežmarok, Poprad)
- Spiš (Gelnica, Levoča, Spišská Nová Ves)
- Zamagurie [ Territory behind the Spišská Magura Mountains] (Stará Ľubovňa)
- Šariš (Bardejov, Prešov, Sabinov, Stropkov, Svidník)
- Košice and surroundings (Košice, Košice-okolie)
- Horný Zemplín [ Upper Zemplin] (Humenné, Medzilaborce, Snina, Vranov n/Topľou)
- Dolný Zemplín [ Lower Zemplin] (Michalovce, Sobrance, Trebišov)

== Division from 2004 ==
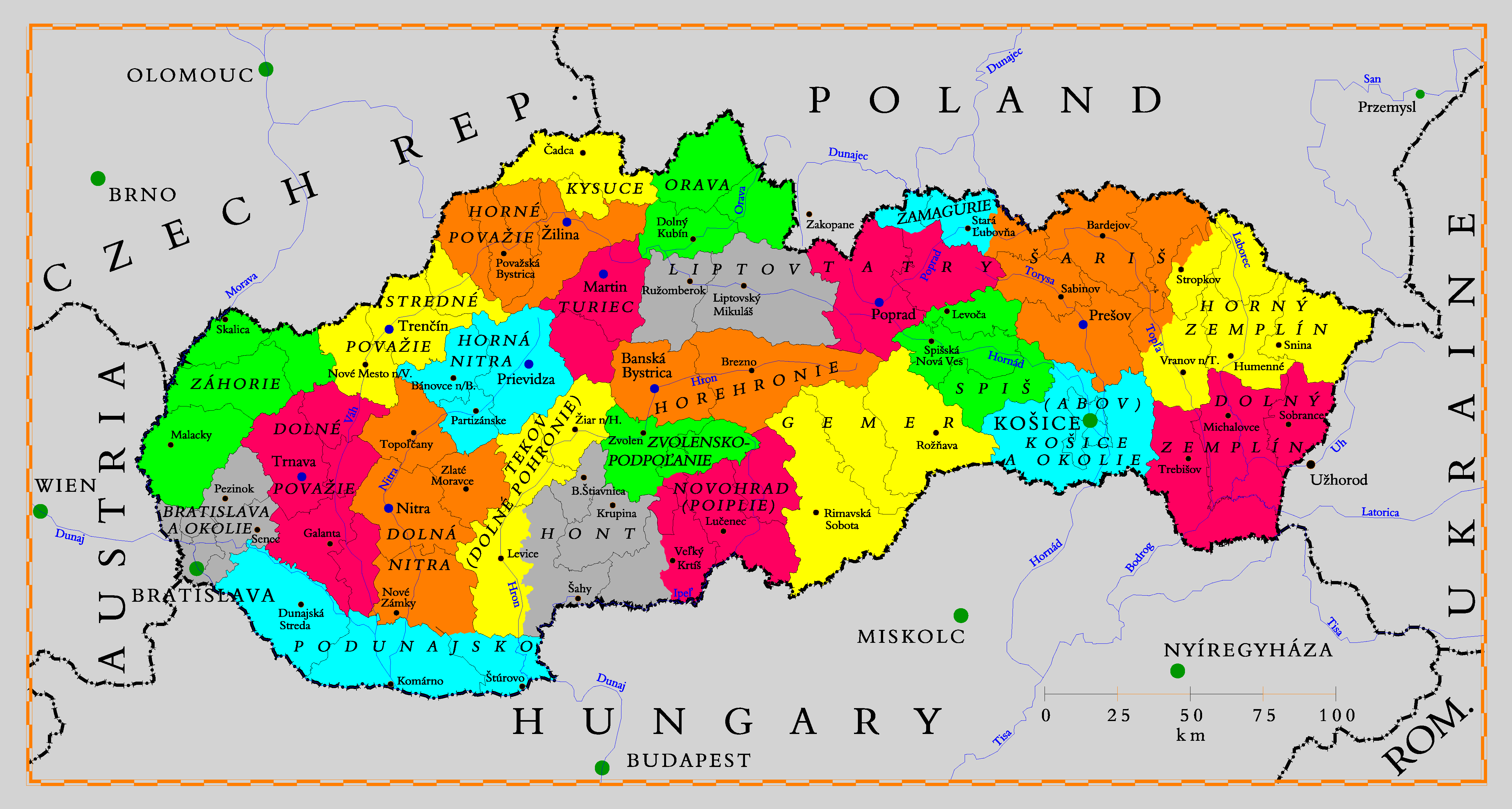
Tourist regions of Slovakia.

- Bratislava
- Záhorie
- Podunajsko
- Dolné Považie [ Lower Váh region]
- Stredné Považie [ Middle Váh region ]
- Severné Považie [ Northern Váh region ]
- Nitriansko [ Nitra region ]
- Horná Nitra [ Upper region ]
- Orava
- Turiec
- Horehronie
- Pohronie
- Tekov (Dolné Pohronie) [ Lower Hron region ]
- Hont
- Zvolensko-Podpoľanie
- Novohrad (Poiplie) [ Ipeľ region ]
- Gemer
- Liptov
- Zamagurie
- Tatras
- Spiš
- Košice
- Šariš
- Horný Zemplín
- Dolný Zemplín

== See also ==
- Regions of Slovakia
- List of traditional regions of Slovakia
