= Gemer (region) =

Region in Slovakia

Coordinates: 48°24′N 20°18′E

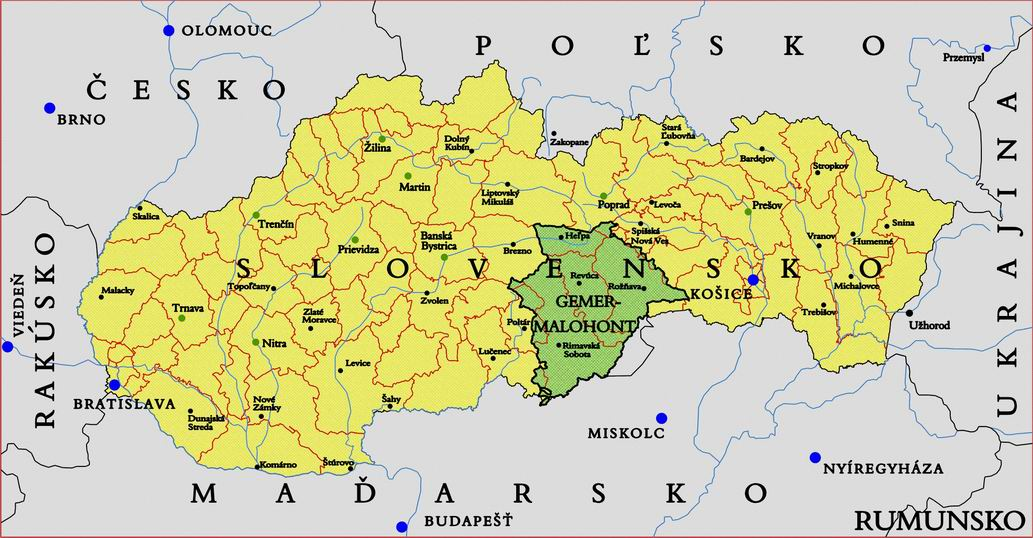
The location of Gemer within Slovakia.

Gemer (Note: Hungarian: Gömör) is a historical region in Central Europe, located in southern Slovakia. Its territory comprises the area that belonged to the Gömör and Kishont County, Kingdom of Hungary, that existed until the 20th century.

It is counted as one of the Tourism Regions of Slovakia. As such, its borders are defined within the districts of Rimavská Sobota, Revúca, and Rožňava. It borders the tourism regions of Novohrad to the west, Horehronie, Tatras, and Spiš to the north, Abov to the east, and Hungary to the south.

== Citations ==
=== Bibliography ===
- Rusin W., Zygmańska B.: Słowacja, Bielsko-Biała: Wydawnictwo Pascal, 2006, ISBN 83-7304-679-8, OCLC 749501739.
