= Daniel H. Janzen =

American evolutionary ecologist

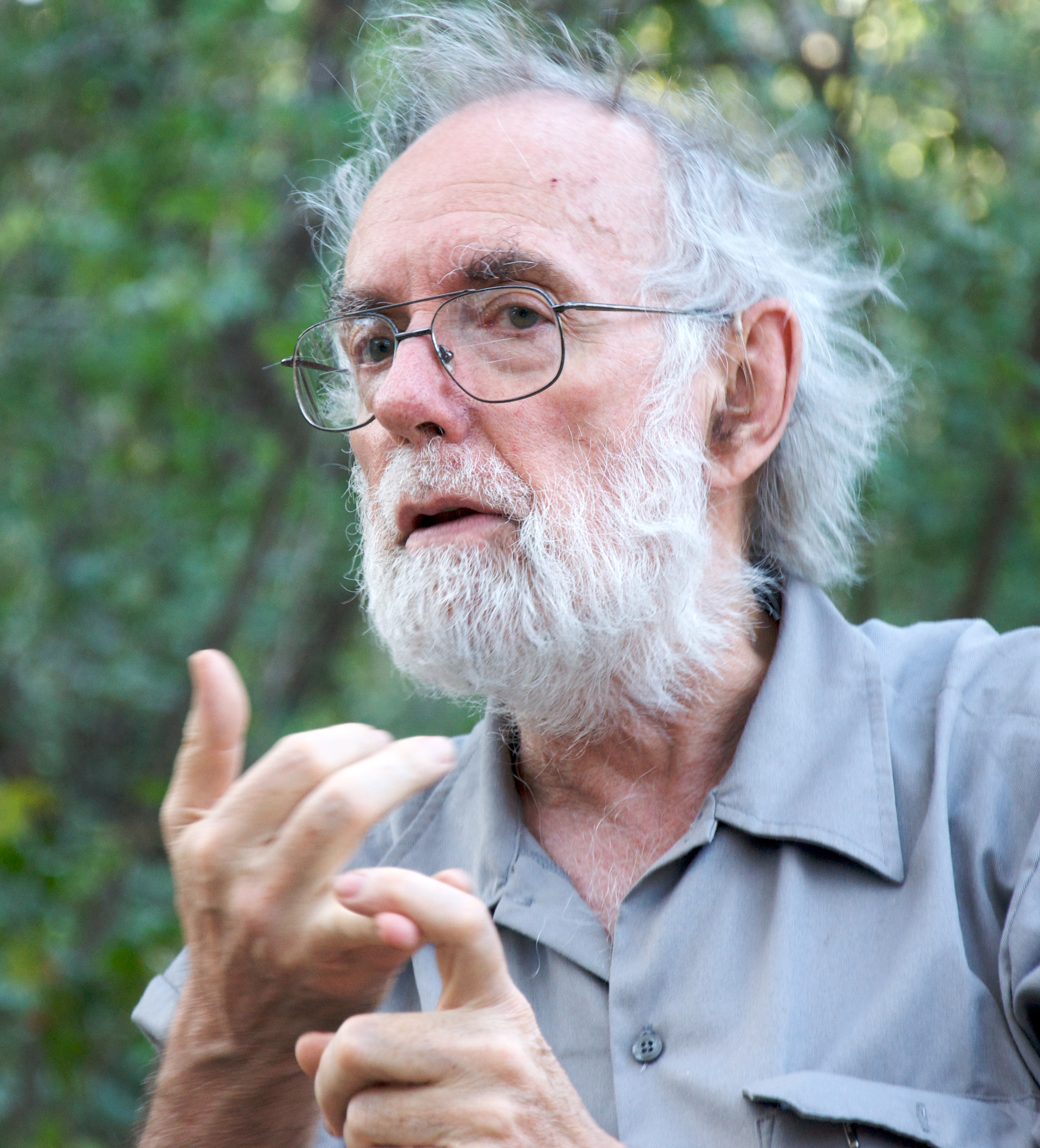
- Janzen in 2009
- Born: Daniel Hunt Janzen; January 18, 1939 (age 87); Milwaukee, Wisconsin, U.S.
- Education: University of Minnesota, University of California, Berkeley
- Known for: Tropical ecology, biodiversity development
- Spouse: Winifred Hallwachs
- Awards: Kyoto Prize
- Scientific career
- Workplaces: University of Pennsylvania, Guanacaste Dry Forest Conservation Fund, Área de Conservación Guanacaste (ACG)

External videos
- "Costa Rica : Paradise Reclaimed", Profile of Dan Janzen in Nature, MacArthur Foundation (WNET Television station : New York, N.Y., 1987)
- "Spark: Heroes, commentary by Rob Pringle", Day's Edge Productions, December 29, 2016

Daniel Hunt Janzen (born January 18, 1939) is an American evolutionary ecologist and conservationist. He divides his time between his professorship in biology at the University of Pennsylvania, where he is the DiMaura Professor of Conservation Biology, and his research and field work in Costa Rica.

Janzen and his wife Winifred Hallwachs have catalogued the biodiversity of Costa Rica. Through a DNA barcoding initiative, Janzen and geneticist Paul Hebert have registered over 500,000 specimens representing more than 45,000 species, which has led to the identification of cryptic species of near-identical appearance that differ in terms of genetics and ecological niche. Janzen and Hallwachs developed some of the most influential hypotheses in ecology that continue to influence research more than 50 years later.

Janzen and Hallwachs helped to establish the Area de Conservación Guanacaste World Heritage Site, one of the oldest, largest and most successful habitat restoration projects in the world.

== Early life and education ==
Daniel Hunt Janzen was born January 18, 1939, in Milwaukee, Wisconsin. His father, Daniel Hugo Janzen, grew up in a Mennonite farming community and served as Director of the United States Fish and Wildlife Service. His father and mother, Miss Floyd Clark Foster of Greenville, South Carolina, were married on April 29, 1937.

Janzen obtained his B.Sc. degree in biology from the University of Minnesota in 1961, and his Ph.D. from the University of California, Berkeley in 1965.

== Career ==
In 1963, Janzen attended a two-month course in tropical biology taught in several field sites throughout Costa Rica. This Advanced Science Seminar in Tropical Biology was the precursor to a Fundamentals in Tropical Biology course, which Janzen designed for the Organization for Tropical Studies (OTS), a consortium of several North American and Costa Rican universities. Janzen went back in 1965 as an instructor and has lectured in at least one of the three yearly courses every year since.

Janzen taught at the University of Kansas (1965–1968), the University of Chicago (1969–1972), and the University of Michigan (1972–1976) before joining the faculty at the University of Pennsylvania. There he is the DiMaura Professor of Conservation Biology, and his research and field work in Costa Rica.

Janzen has also held teaching positions in Venezuela (Universidad de Oriente, Cumaná in 1965–66; Universidad de los Los Andes, Mérida in 1973), and in Puerto Rico (Universidad de Puerto Rico, Río Piedras, 1969).

== Área del Conservación de Guanacaste (ACG) ==
The Área de Conservación de Guanacaste (ACG) is a prominent conservation area in northwestern Costa Rica, encompassing over 163,000 hectares of diverse ecosystems, including tropical dry forests, rainforests, and marine areas. Established in the 1990s, the ACG unifies several national parks, such as Santa Rosa, Guanacaste, Rincón de la Vieja, and Junquillal Bay, into a single administrative entity. This integration aims to protect and restore the region's unique biodiversity and facilitate natural ecosystem regeneration. The ACG is recognized as a UNESCO World Heritage Site, highlighting its global ecological significance and Costa Rica's commitment to environmental conservation.

Dr. Daniel Janzen, recognizing the necessity for a cohesive conservation strategy in Guanacaste, along with his wife, biologist Dr. Winnie Hallwachs, championed the establishment of a contiguous conservation area to facilitate natural ecosystem regeneration.

Their comprehensive strategy encompassed several key initiatives:

- Restoring Tropical Dry Forests: Acquiring degraded pastures and enabling the recovery of natural vegetation.
- Integrating Local Communities: Training local residents to serve as park guards, educators, and conservation advocates.
- Fundraising for Land Purchases: Securing donations and forming partnerships with international organizations to purchase private lands and integrate them into the protected area.

== Research ==
Janzen's early work focused on the careful and meticulous documentation of species in Costa Rica, and in particular on ecological processes and the dynamics and evolution of animal-plant interactions. In 1967, for example he described the phenological specialization of bee-pollinated species of Bignoniaceae, amongst them a "kind of mass flowering", which Alwyn Howard Gentry in his classification of flowering named Type 4 or "big bang" strategy. Janzen proposed many hypotheses that inspired decades of work by tropical and temperate ecologists (see below).

Miguel Altieri in his textbook Agroecology: The Science of Sustainable Agriculture says: "Janzen's 1973 article on tropical agroecosystems was the first widely read evaluation of why tropical agricultural systems might function differently from those of the temperate zones".

In 1985, realizing that the area in which they worked was threatened, Janzen and Hallwachs expanded the focus of their work to include tropical forest restoration, expansion (through land purchases) and conservation. They employed the help of local Costa Ricans, converting their farming skills into parataxonomy, a term they coined in the late 1980s. As of 2017, some 10,000 new species in the Area de Conservacion Guanacaste have been identified thanks to the efforts of parataxonomists.

Through a DNA barcoding initiative with geneticist Paul Hebert, they have registered over 500,000 specimens representing more than 45,000 species, which has led to the identification of cryptic species of near-identical appearance that differ in terms of genetics and ecological niche. Janzen and Hallwachs have supported species barcoding initiatives at both national and international levels through the Instituto Nacional de Biodiversidad (INBio), CBOL (Consortium for the Barcode of Life) and iBOL (International Barcode of Life).

=== Influential hypotheses ===
Janzen is known for proposing "characteristically imaginative and unorthodox" hypotheses. These hypotheses have received varying degrees of support, but are notable for having inspired a large and sustained body of research, as evidenced by the extremely high citation rates of many of his papers for decades after they are published.

One of Janzen's most famous ideas (from his most highly cited paper) is now known as the Janzen-Connell hypothesis, as Janzen and Joseph Connell independently proposed the idea in 1970-1971. They both suggested that the high diversity of tropical trees was due, in part, to specialist enemies attacking seeds or seedlings that were particularly close to the parent tree or particularly densely clustered, thus preventing any one species from becoming dominant.

Another influential idea comes from Janzen's 1967 paper 'Why mountain passes are higher in the tropics'. It proposes that tropical mountains are more of a barrier to species dispersal than temperate mountains because tropical species are less able to tolerate changes in temperature with elevation, having evolved and lived in relatively stable climates.

In a 1977 paper 'Why fruits rot, seeds mould, and meat spoils', Janzen proposed that microbes render food inedible (or at least distasteful) to vertebrates not just as a by product of microbe-microbe competition or accidental waste products, but as an evolutionary strategy to repel vertebrates consumers, who would otherwise eat the food resource and the microbes themselves. Evidence is mixed, and it is hard to test whether compounds evolved to deter other microbes or vertebrates, but the idea has been widely incorporated into studies of vertebrate feeding from humans to dinosaurs.

=== Coevolution of plants and animals ===
- Coevolution of a mutualistic system in New World tropics between species of Acacia (Mimosoideae; Leguminosae), v. gr., Acacia cornigera, and the ant Pseudomyrmex ferruginea (Formicidae). Acacia spp in the Neotropics are protected by ants against defoliation; for this, the ants are rewarded by means of special organs and physiology that Acacia has evolved.
- Spondias mombin (Anacardiaceae) lost its megafauna seed dispersers in the Pleistocene. Between fire in open pastures and seed predation by bruchid beetles in closed-canopy forest, S. mombin does not stand a chance. But, today, in Guanacaste, seeds are dispersed by deer and some 15 other mammals, that feed mostly in forest edges, where bruchids are less likely to find the seeds and fires are not so frequent.

=== Tropical habitat restoration ===
Tropical dry forests are the world's most threatened forest ecosystems. In middle America there were 550 000 km^{2} of dry forests at the beginning of the 16th century; today, less than 0.08% (440 km^{2}) remains. They have been cleared, burnt and replaced by pastures for cattle raising, at an ever-faster rate during the last 500 years.

In 1985, realizing that widespread development in northwestern Costa Rica was rapidly decimating the forest in which they conducted their research, Janzen and Hallwachs expanded the focus of their work. Janzen and his wife helped to establish the Area de Conservación Guanacaste World Heritage Site (ACG), one of the oldest, largest and most successful habitat restoration projects in the world. They began with the Parque Nacional Santa Rosa, which included 100 km^{2} (25,000 acres) of pasture and relictual neotropical dry forest and 230 km^{2} (57,000 acres) of marine habitat. This eventually became the Área de Conservación Guanacaste, located just south of the Costa Rica-Nicaragua border, between the Pacific Ocean and the Cordillera de Tilaran which integrated four different national parks. Together these house at least 15 different biotopes (namely mangroves, dry forest and shrubs; ephemeral, rainy season, and permanent streams; fresh water and littoral swamps; evergreen rainforests and cloud forests, etc.), holding approximately 4% of the world's plant, mammal, bird, reptile, amphibian, fish, and insect diversity, all within an area of less than 169,000 hectares (420,000 acres). It is one of the oldest, largest and most successful habitat restoration projects in the world. As of 2019, it consists of 169,000 hectares (420,000 acres). The park exemplifies their beliefs about how a park should be run. It is known as a center of biological research, forest restoration and community outreach.

Habitat restoration is not a simple matter. Not only must one fight against hundreds of years of ecological degradation, manifested in the form of altered drainage patterns, hard-to-eradicate pastures, compacted soils, exhausted seed banks, diminished adult and propagule stocks, and the proliferation of fire-resistant and unpalatable weeds from the Old World tropics and subtropics. One is also faced with the difficulties of changing a culture that coevolved with, profited from, and can become miserable with such a system.

For this reason ACG was conceived as a cultural restoration project, which, to paraphrase its natural counterpart, ought to be grown as well. ACG integrates complementary processes of experimentation, habitat restoration and cultural development. The techniques used include:

- Active restoration, artificial dispersal of propagules from plant species native to the Guanacaste habitats
- Passive restoration by means of fire, anti-poaching and herbivore control
- Ecological education and sensibilisation

== Personal life ==
Janzen is married to ecologist Winifred Hallwachs, who is also his frequent research partner. Of Hallwachs, Janzen has said, "We did these things together," and "we are very much together in perceiving things the same things....Since I'm the vocal member, it's then attributed to me. But I would say these ideas and directions and thoughts and actions are easily fifty-fifty attributable."

== Honorary distinctions ==
Janzen has been subject to recognition many times in the US, as well as in Europe and Latin America; the monetary endowments of these prizes have been invested in the trust fund of the ACG or another of his conservation's projects in Costa Rica. Prizes and distinctions garnered by Janzen include:

- 1975, The Henry Allan Gleason Award, Botanical Society of America
- 1984, Crafoord Prize: Coevolutionary ecology. Royal Swedish Academy of Sciences
- 1985, Distinguished Teaching Award, University of Pennsylvania
- 1987, The Berkeley Citation for Distinguished Achievement and Notable Service to the University, University of California, Berkeley
- 1987, Hijo Ilustre de Guanacaste (awarded by the Governor of Guanacaste province)
- 1987, Global 500 Roll of Honour, UNEP
- 1989, MacArthur Fellowship
- 1989, Leidy Award, Philadelphia Academy of Natural Sciences
- 1991, Founder's Council Award of Merit, Field Museum of Natural History
- 1992, Member, National Academy of Sciences, USA
- 1993, Award for Improvement of Costa Rican Quality of Life, Universidad de Costa Rica (co award with W. Hallwachs).
- 1994, Silver Medal Award, International Society of Chemical Ecology.
- 1995, Global Service Award, Society for Conservation Biology
- 1996, Honorary Doctor of Science, University of Minnesota.
- 1996, Thomas G. and Louise E. DiMaura Endowed Term Chair, University of Pennsylvania
- 1997, Kyoto Prize (Basic Sciences Field), Inamori Foundation
- 2002, Albert Einstein World Award of Science, Consejo Cultural Mundial, (Mexico)
- 2002, Honorary Fellow of the Association for Tropical Biology (and Conservation) (ATBC)
- 2006, Winner, National Outdoor Book Awards (NOBA), for 100 Caterpillars: Portraits from the Tropical Forests of Costa Rica (2006), Design & Artistic Merit Category.
- 2011, BBVA Foundation Frontiers of Knowledge Award of Ecology and Conservation Biology for his pioneering work in tropical ecology and his contributions to the conservation of endangered tropical ecosystems throughout the world, drawing on an understanding of plant-animal interactions. Janzen acknowledged the role of his wife and long-term research partner, ecologist Winnie Hallwachs, to the work being recognized.
- 2013, Wege Foundation $5 million grant to the Guanacaste Dry Forest Conservation Fund (GDFCF), founded in 1997 by Dan Janzen and Winnie Hallwachs.
- 2014, Blue Planet Prize, from the Asahi Glass Foundation

== See also ==
- Ecological fitting
- Janzen–Connell hypothesis

== Publications ==
The following is a selection of Janzen's publications that are not otherwise listed.

- Rosenthal, Gerald A.; Janzen, Daniel H., eds. (1979), Herbivores: Their Interaction with Secondary Plant Metabolites, New York: Academic Press, p. 41, ISBN 0-12-597180-X
- Janzen, Daniel H., ed. (1983), Costa Rican Natural History, Chicago: University of Chicago Press, p. 823, ISBN 978-0-226-39334-6
- Janzen, Daniel H. (September 1966). "Coevolution of Mutualism Between Ants and Acacias in Central America". Evolution. 20 (3): 249–275. doi:10.2307/2406628. JSTOR 2406628. PMID 28562970.
- Janzen, Daniel H. (1985). "Spondias mombin is culturally deprived in megafauna-free forest". Journal of Tropical Ecology. 1 (2): 131–155. doi:10.1017/S0266467400000195. JSTOR 2559336. S2CID 86663441.
- Janzen, D. H. (1986). Guanacaste National Park: tropical ecological and cultural restoration. San José, Costa Rica: Editorial Universidad Estatal a Distancia. ISBN 9977-64-316-4.
