= Jennifer Sarah Powers =

American ecologist

Jennifer Powers
- Born: Jennifer Sarah Powers

Academic background
- Education: Reed College (BA); Oregon State University (MS); Duke University (PhD)
- Doctoral advisor: William H. Schlesinger

Academic work
- Discipline: Ecology
- Sub-discipline: Tropical and subtropical dry broadleaf forests
- Institutions: Stony Brook University; University of Minnesota

Jennifer S. Powers is an American ecologist and full professor in the departments of ecology, evolution and behavior, and plant and microbial biology at the University of Minnesota. Powers' research has advanced the understanding of global change consequences, ecosystem ecology, restoration and conservation of tropical dry forests. She also has been very active on several editorial boards, and in 2019 became the editor-in-chief of Biotropica, a scientific journal from the Association of Tropical Biology and Conservation (ATBC).

== Education ==
Powers received her B.A. in biology from Reed College in 1991. In 1995, she completed her Master of Science in the department of forest science at Oregon State University. She received her Ph.D. in biology at Duke University in 2001, working with William H. Schlesinger.

== Career ==
After completing her PhD, Powers did postdoctoral work at Stony Brook University and at the University of Minnesota. She has been working in tropical forest, with special interest in tropical dry forests, in Central and South America for over 20 years. Jennifer is also part of the 2ndFOR research network on secondary forests, a founder of investigadores ACG (iACG), a volunteer organization that promotes research in the Área de Conservación Guanacaste (ACG) in Costa Rica, a research associate at the Smithsonian Tropical Research Institute (STRI) Smithsonian Tropical Research Institute in Panama and an officer of ATBC.

== Awards and honors ==
- 2009–2011. McKnight Land Grant Professor, University of Minnesota
- 2009–2012. Institute on the Environment Resident Fellow
- 2020. Ecological Society of America Fellow
