= Podpoľanie =

Historic region in Slovakia

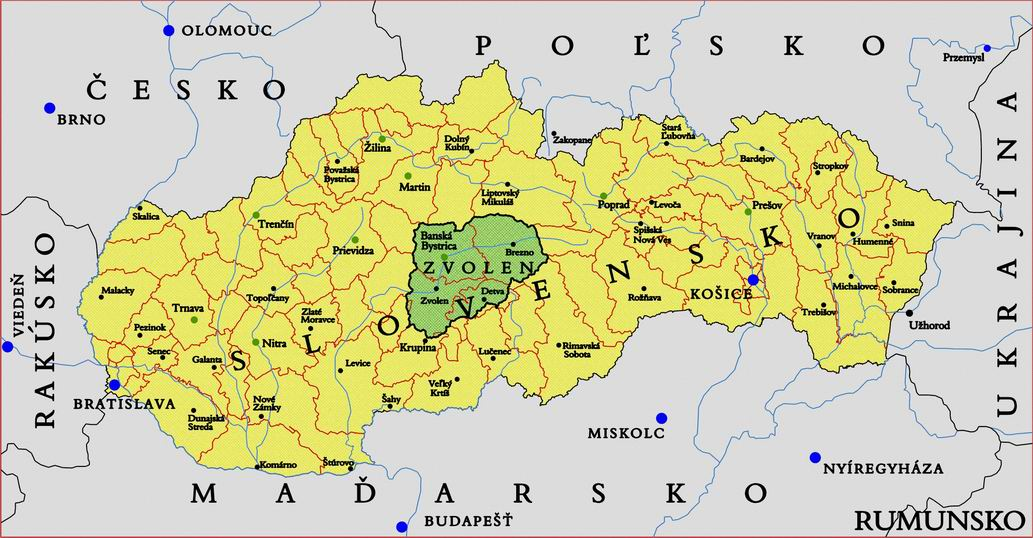
Map of Podpoľanie in Slovakia

Podpoľanie (sometime referred to as Zvolensko) is a Slovak region located in the central part of the Banská Bystrica region. The territory represents a typical foothill area with a characteristic scattered spa settlement, which is a specific phenomenon within Slovakia due to its size and structure. The administrative center of the region is the district town of Detva.

== History ==
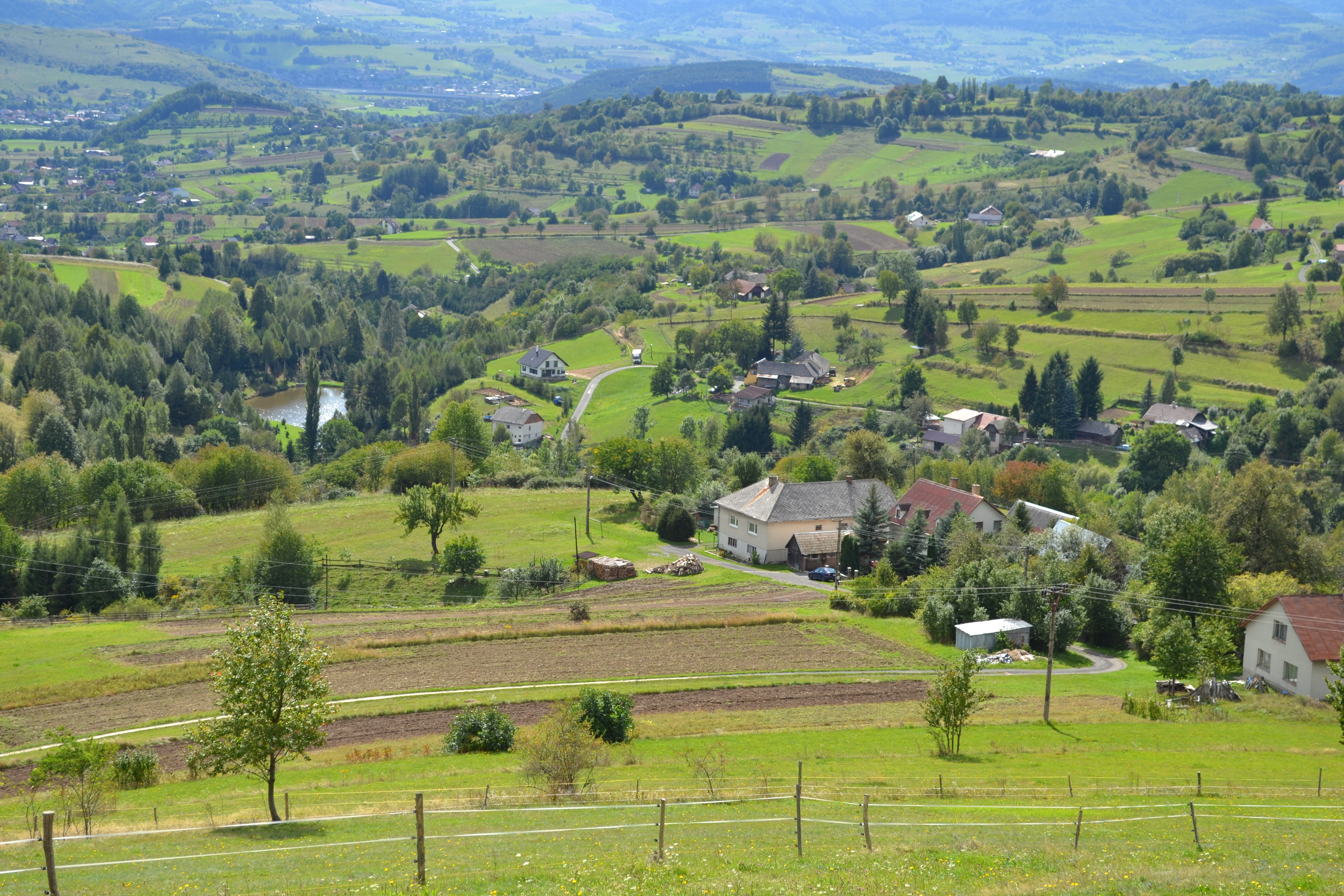
Surroundings of Hriňová

The earliest evidence of prehistoric settlement in the region dates back to the Bronze Age, with archaeological finds discovered on the Kaľamárka rock plateau near Chrapková. The shape of the hill resembles a castle encircled by stone ramparts, featuring a flat courtyard area and a well at the summit. Known as Detva Castle, the site holds significant archaeological importance. Although Detva is a relatively young village in historical terms, archaeological discoveries indicate that the area was inhabited as far back as the Celtic period. The discovery of Roman coins suggests habitation during the time of Emperor Marcus Aurelius, while finds of coins and an iron sword confirm settlement during the Great Moravian era. The region under Poľana, once densely forested, began to be populated in the 13th and 14th centuries. The earliest settlements in the area included villages such as Slovenská Ľupča, Poniky, Zolná, Mičiná, Očová, and Zvolenská Slatina.

Despite challenging living conditions, the villages of Podpoľanie prospered economically, particularly through sheep breeding, which became the foundation for bryndza cheese production and gained regional fame. The region's extensive forests supported logging and wood processing, with timber floated down streams and transported via narrow-gauge railways. Nowadays, the Čiernohronská railway from Čierny Balog to Hronec stands as a technical monument and a tourist attraction.

== Location ==
The territory borders on Horehroní in the northeast, Novohrad in the southeast, Hont in the southwest and Tekovo in the northwest. Its territory also includes the entire Detva district, the municipalities of Očová, Zvolenská Slatina and Lukavica from the Zvolen district, the municipality of Hrochoť from the Banská Bystrica district, the municipality of Budiná from the Lučenec district.

The territory is dominated by the Poľany massif, the highest extinct volcano in Central Europe with a height of 1,458 m above sea level. The lowest point of the area near the municipality of Vígľaš reaches 350 m above sea level. m. Approximately 38 thousand inhabitants live in this area, which covers an area of approximately 588 km².

== Environment ==
The foothills of the mountain range are distinguished by its forests, streams and mineral springs, as well as by their unique and still active folk culture. The stratovolcano of Poľana (1,458 m above sea level) is one of the highest extinct volcanoes in Europe. The territory of Poľana was declared a protected landscape area and was included in the UNESCO World Biosphere Reserve Network (20,360 ha). Rare ecosystems are also found in the area.
