= Instituto Nacional de Biodiversidad =

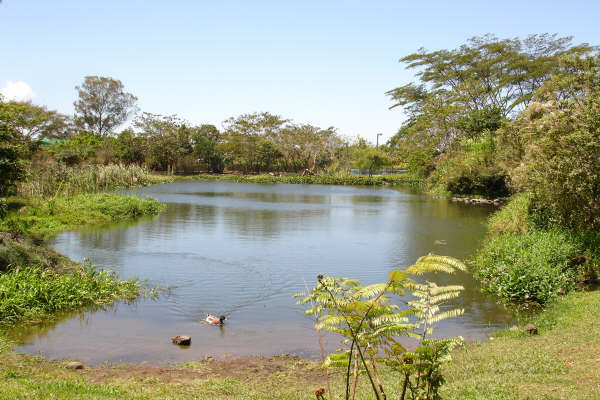
View of INBioparque's lake.

The Instituto Nacional de Biodiversidad (INBio) is a private research and biodiversity management center based in Costa Rica. Established in 1989, despite its national status, it operates as a non-governmental, non-profit organization that works in close collaboration with different government institutions, universities, and the private sector to gather knowledge on the country's biological diversity and promote its sustainable use.

The institute's pioneering work led to the curation of a massive biodiversity collection containing over 3.5 million specimens of arthropods, plants, fungi, and mollusks, with individual tracking cataloged under its proprietary computer database, Atta.

== Institutional Transition and Asset Transfer ==
Due to severe operational budget deficits, INBio executed an executive transition agreement with the Costa Rican government in early 2015. On March 27, 2015, INBio officially transferred its entire historical collection of 3.5 million biological specimens to the State, passing permanent curation responsibilities over to the Natural History Department of the National Museum of Costa Rica (MNCR).

Along with the scientific registry, the state assumed management of its electronic databases, shelving arrays, and associated hardware infrastructures. Following this massive structural assets downscale, INBio re-aligned its operational focus to function strictly as a streamlined, self-sustaining scientific "think tank," providing specialized training, international consulting, and regulated bio-prospecting services.

== History ==
Costa Rica decided in 1989 that some sort of organization was necessary to study the biodiversity of Costa Rica. The government did not have the ability at the time to fund a new organization so a handful of scientists and entrepreneurs took the initiative and created the non-profit organization now known as INBio. Among the founders of the institution was Rodrigo Gámez, a remarkable and well known Costa Rican scientist who has a strong desire for teaching people about the importance of biodiversity and its conservation. He received the MAGÓN award (Premio Nacional de Cultura Magón) in 2012, which is an award of great importance that is given every year to someone who has contributed to Costa Rica, in this case related to science. In that same year he received an international award known as the MIDORI prize, given to him in Japan, by a Japanese institution; he has also received a great number of other awards in the past. Rodrigo Gámez is still president at the institution.

In 1995 INBio was awarded the Prince of Asturias Award for Technical and Scientific Research.

In 2014, INBio was jointly awarded the Blue Planet Prize, an international environmental award presented by the Asahi Glass Foundation, with Professor Daniel Janzen.

== Structure ==
There are many different components to INBio such as Bio-prospecting, INBioparque, INBio editorial, and the many different research areas such as arthropods, fungi, and plants. Bio-prospecting is the division dealing with finding useful products from the specimens collected. INBio has worked with organizations such as Merck, Bristol-Myers Squibb, and the University of Massachusetts Amherst. INBioparque is a natural park in Santo Domingo, Heredia, just 85 km (53 mi) north/east of downtown San Jose in Costa Rica. The research programs vary from studying the spider family Oonopidae to compiling a book with all of the genera of known and described flies in Central America. Such a project has never been done in a tropical place with such a large biodiversity.

== Areas of activity ==
The institute's work has chiefly developed in the following areas:

=== Inventory and monitoring ===
Generating information on the diversity of the country's species and ecosystems. It currently owns a collection of more than 3 million specimens, each identified and cataloged, including arthropods, plants, fungi and mollusks. Furthermore, information on the country's different ecosystems is generated.

=== Conservation ===
Integrating the information generated by INBio into decision-making processes for the protection and sustainable use of its biodiversity, for both the public and private sectors. INBio works closely with SINAC (Sistema de Áreas de Conservación; Conservation Areas System), being considered a strategic partner in the protection of the country's protected areas.

=== Communication and education ===
Sharing information and understanding of biodiversity with different sectors of the public, seeking to create a wider knowledge of its value. Most of this effort is centered in the INBiopark, a theme-park opened in 2000 which aims to bring families and visitors closer to the rich Costa Rican nature. Furthermore, through other methods INBio looks to strengthen the environmental component of the Costa Rican population's actions and decisions.

=== Bioinformatics ===
Developing and applying technological tools to support the process of generation, administration, analysis and dissemination of information on biodiversity. The information on each specimen in the biodiversity inventory can be found in a database named Atta, accessible to the public through INBio's webpage.

=== Bioprospecting ===
Searching for sustainable, commercially applicable uses of the resources of biodiversity. INBio has been a pioneering institution in establishing research agreements for the search for chemical substances, genes, etc., present in plants, insects, marine organisms and microorganisms, which could be used by the pharmaceutical, medical, biotechnology, cosmetics, nutritional and agricultural industries. INBio, although it is a national initiative given its scope, has become an international force for trying to integrate conservation and development. The application of scientific knowledge of biodiversity to economic activities such as ecotourism, medicine, agriculture or the development of mechanisms of collection and payment for environmental services exemplify this force for integration, and are part of the activities which attract the attention of the international community.

=== Publishing ===
From 1996 to 2011, Editorial InBio published important books about specific aspects of Costa Rican and Latin American biodiversity:

==== 1996 ====
- Los Bosques de Roble (Quercus) de la Cordillera de Talamanca, Costa Rica: Biodiversidad, Ecología, Conservación y Desarrollo by Maarten Kappelle (1996) ISBN 9968702056

==== 1997 ====
- Árboles de Costa Rica / Trees of Costa Rica by various authors (1997-2004) In 3 volumes. 1: ISBN 9977750033 3: ISBN 9968702889
- Árboles del Parque Nacional Manuel Antonio: Trees of Manuel Antonio National Park by Patrick Harmon (2004) ISBN 9968702897

==== 2000 ====
- Bromelias de Costa Rica Bromeliads by J. Francisco Morales (2000) ISBN 9968702390

==== 2002 ====
- Murciélagos de Costa Rica / Costa Rica Bats by Richard K. Laval and Bernald Rodríguez (2002) ISBN 9968702633
- Murciélagos de Costa Rica / Costa Rica Bats by Richard K. Laval and Bernald Rodríguez (2002) ISBN 9968702633
- Arrecifes coralinos del Carib de Costa Rica = The coral reefs of Costa Rica's Caribbean coast by Jorge Cortés and lberto León (2002) ISBN 996870265X
- Líquenes de Costa Rica / Costa Rica Lichens by Loengrin Umaña and Harrie Sipman (2002) ISBN 9968702749
- Plantas Acuáticas del Parque Nacional Palo Verde / Aquatic Plants of Palo Verde National Park by Garrett E. Crow (2002) ISBN 9968702625
- Ecosistemas de la Cuenca Hidrográfica Del Río Savegre, Costa Rica by Heiner Acevedo, Julio Bustamante, Luis Paniagua and Ronald Chaves (2002) ISBN 9968702730

==== 2003 ====
- Ecosistemas Del Area De Conservacion Osa (ACOSA) / Ecosystems of the Osa Conservation Area (ACOSA) by Maarten Kappelle, Marco Castro, and Heiner Acevedo (2003) ISBN 9968702773
- Plantas Comunes Del Parque Nacional Chirripó, Costa Rica / Common Plants of Chirripó National Park by Evelio Alfaro Vindas (2003) ISBN 996870282X

==== 2004 ====
- Los Increíbles Higuerones / Incredible Fig Trees by Carlos E. Valerio (2004) ISBN 9968702951
- Abejas de Orquídeas de la América Tropical: Biología y guía de campo / Orchid Bees of Tropical America: Biology and Field Guide by David W. Roubik and Paul E. Hanson (2004) ISBN 9968702943
- Ballenas y delfines de América Central / Whales and Dolphins of Central America by Joel C. Sáenz, Grace Wong and Eduardo Carrillo (2004) ISBN 9968702927

==== 2005 ====
- Plantas comunes de la Reserva Biológica Hitoy Cerere / Common Plants of the Hitoy Cerere Biological Reserve - Costa Rica by José González (2005) ISBN 9968927066
- Árboles y arbustos comunes del Parque Internacional La Amistad by Luis González Arce (2005) ISBN 9968927112
- Peces de la Isla del Coco = Isla del Coco fishes by Ginger Garrison (2005) ISBN 9968927058
- Páramos de Costa Rica by Maarten Kappelle and Sally P. Horn (2005) ISBN 9968927090
- Árboles y Arbustos Comunes del Parque Internacional La Amistad by Luis González Arce (2005) ISBN 9968927112
- Historia Natural de Golfito, Costa Rica by Jorge Lobo and Federico Bolaños (2005) ISBN 9968927074

==== 2006 ====
- Libélulas de Mesoamérica y el Caribe / Dragonflies and Damselflies of Middle America and the Caribbean by Carlos Esquivel (2006) ISBN 9968927139
- Dípteros De Costa Rica Y La América Tropical / Diptera of Costa Rica and the New World Tropics by Manuel A. Zumbado (2006) ISBN 9968927147
- Orquídeas, Cactus y Bromelias del Bosque Seco Costa Rica =: Costa Rica Orchids, Cacti and Bromeliads of the Dry Forest by J. Francisco Morales (2006) ISBN 9968927082
- Membrácidos de la América Tropical / Treehoppers of Tropical America by Carolina Godoy, Ximena Miranda and Kenji Nishida (2006) ISBN 9968927104
- Gesneriáceas de Costa Rica / Gesneriads of Costa Rica by Ricardo Kriebel Haehner (2006) ISBN 9968927171

==== 2007 ====
- Mariposas de Costa Rica / Butterflies and Moths of Costa Rica by Isidro Chacón and José Montero (2007) 2nd edition ISBN 9968927236
- Ranas de Vidrio de Costa Rica / Glass frogs of Costa Rica by Brian Kubicki and Brian Kubicki (2007) 2nd edition: ISBN 9968927252 1st edition: ISBN 9968927236
- Guía de aves de Costa Rica by Gary Stiles, Alexander F. Skutch and Dana Gardner (2007) ISBN 9968927279. This is a Spanish translation of the authors' original English-language book, A Guide to the Birds of Costa Rica
- Mamíferos Silvestres del Parque Internacional La Amistad by Álvaro Herrera (2007) ISBN 9968927228
- Árboles Comunes de la Reserva Natural Absoluta Cabo Blanco Costa Rica / Common Trees of Cabo Blanco Absolute Nature Reserve by Fabricio Camacho Céspedes and Erin Stewart Lindquist (2007) ISBN 9968927244
- Murciélagos Neotropicales Que Acampan En Hojas: Guía De Campo / Neotropical Tent-roosting Bats: Field Guide by Bernal Rodríguez-Herrera, Rodrigo A. Medellín and Robert M. Timm (2007) ISBN 9968927287

==== 2008 ====
- Historia Natural del Parque Nacional Chirripó by Adelaida Chaverri Polini (2008) ISBN 9968927341

==== 2009 ====
- Orquídeas de Costa Rica / Orchids of Costa Rica by J. Francisco Morales (2009) In 5 volumes. 1: ISBN 9968927368 2: ISBN 9968927376 3: ISBN 9968927384 4: ISBN 9968927392 5: ISBN 9968927406
- Plantas Comestibles de Centroamérica by Fabio Rojas Carballo and Diana Ávila Solera (2009) ISBN 9968927422
- Flores de pasión de Costa Rica / Passion Flowers of Costa Rica by Armando Estrada and Alexánder Rodríguez (2009) ISBN 9968927414

==== 2010 ====
- Árboles Maderables de Costa Rica: Ecología y Silvicultura / Timber Trees of Costa Rica: Ecology and Silviculture by Quírico Jiménez Madrigal, Freddy Rojas Rodríguez, Víctor Rojas Chacón and Lucía Rodríguez Sánchez (2010) ISBN 9968927651

==== 2011 ====
- Microhongos comunes de Costa Rica y otras regiones tropicales/ Common microfungi of Costa Rica & other tropical regions by P. Chaverri, M. Huhndorf, J. D. Rogers and G.J. Samuels (2011) ISBN 996892766X
