= Kill the Winner hypothesis =

Microbiological population model hypothesis

The "Kill the Winner" hypothesis relates to Lotka-Volterra equations.

Viral lysis, which disproportionately targets the "winners" of marine ecosystems.

The "Kill the Winner" hypothesis (KtW) is an ecological model of population growth involving prokaryotes, viruses and protozoans that links trophic interactions to biogeochemistry. The model is related to the Lotka–Volterra equations. It assumes that prokaryotes adopt one of two strategies when competing for limited resources: priority is either given to population growth ("winners") or survival ("defenders"). As "winners" become more abundant and active in their environment, their contact with host-specific viruses (also known as phages) increases, making them more susceptible to viral infection and lysis. Thus, viruses moderate the population size of "winners" and allow multiple species (both "winners" and "defenders") to coexist. Current understanding of KtW primarily stems from studies of lytic viruses and their host populations.

KtW provides a possible solution to the paradox of the plankton. It provides a mechanism for species coexistence despite resource limitations. Some investigations into virus-bacteria interactions in laboratory settings have suggested viruses play a major role in maintaining microbial diversity and provided more evidence in support of KtW.

Competition specialists, or "winners", are often the fastest growing populations. Their abundance and activity increases when they outcompete other species for a shared limiting resource (e.g. phosphate). The resource can exist as a free form or as something that needs to be sequestered from biomass. Competition specialists (predators, grazers, parasites) are expected to dominate in oligotrophic environments where competition is a large ecological constraint. When competition specialists are found at uncharacteristically low abundances in oligotrophic environments, viruses may be responsible for moderating their population size.

Defence specialists invest resources in strategies to avoid viral infection, but these strategies may result in reduced growth. Hence, the "defender" does not increase viral predation. Defence specialists are expected to dominate in eutrophic environments where competition pressure is reduced.

While the KtW model is widely applicable to different trophic levels and complex microbial systems, it has many limitations. The KtW model represents an idealized microbial food web with mathematical parameters that only account for viral predation studied in vitro. Because it assumes environmental conditions are stable, it can only predict population dynamics over a small time frame relative to a microbial community's history. It also fails to account for the fact that a prokaryotic species can be attacked by multiple viruses at once. The KtW model may be modified as other models that assess its limitations (e.g. CKTW) are developed.

== History ==
=== Paradox of the plankton ===
The "Kill the Winner" hypothesis is related to the paradox of the plankton, which is an observation that many planktonic species exist despite having similar resource requirements. This paradox was first noted by G.E. Hutchinson in 1961 in relation to phytoplankton. He noticed that many distinct species coexisted despite filling the same niche. In a well-mixed pelagic environment, with conditions being roughly constant, prior biological theories (e.g. the competitive exclusion principle) suggested one species should eventually dominate. Selective predation, symbiotic interactions, and variations in environmental conditions over space and time were initially proposed as solutions to the paradox.

=== Virus-bacteria interactions ===
Early modelling of viral infections in bacterial populations assumed a predator-prey relationship between viruses and bacteria following the Lotka-Volterra equations. Viruses and bacteria were thought to coexist stably in cycles of high and low population. These theoretical models of virus-bacteria interactions were supported by studies of Escherichia coli and bacteriophages in laboratory settings. It was also observed that multiple strains of E.coli could coexist if nutrients were limited and phages were introduced to the culture. Growth-oriented, phage-susceptible E.coli could coexist stably with slower-growing strains that were more resistant to infection. However, these experiments could not replicate the high diversity, grazing, and environmental conditions of marine ecosystems.

=== "Kill the Winner" ===
The "Kill the Winner" hypothesis was first raised in a 1997 study of theoretical models for marine bacterial populations. In this study, T. Frede Thingstad and Risto Lignell found that the total size of a bacterial population was controlled by grazing and that lytic viruses had no impact on bacterial abundance in any of their nutrient-limited models. Instead, viruses promoted diversity by preferentially infecting more abundant and active bacteria. Thingstad later found that bacteria with varying growth rates could coexist stably, with faster-growing bacterial species maintaining a higher abundance of viruses. In this way, viruses can prevent the dominance of one species in any particular niche, which maintains microbial diversity and presents a solution to the paradox of the plankton. More recent discoveries of the significant role viruses play in cellular turnover also support the idea that viruses play a major role in maintaining planktonic diversity.

=== Support for the "Kill the Winner" hypothesis ===
"Kill the Winner" dynamics are primarily observed in aquatic ecosystems. In these environments, the population dynamics of bacteria and their host-specific viruses are often coupled. For example, data from Lake Constance in Germany shows that spikes in bacterial abundance generally lead to spikes in viral infection. Additionally, virus-induced mortality makes up a significant portion of total mortality in bacterial communities, illustrating how tightly viruses control bacterial abundance.

In 2023, ribosomal sequencing of coastal seawater samples revealed that abundant slow-growing taxa remain abundant because they are subject to low viral lysis. In contrast, fast-growing taxa are rare because they experience high viral lysis. These observations support the principles of KtW in coastal ecosystems.

Interestingly, the principles of KtW are seldom observed elsewhere. The microbial community of the human gut, for example, does not appear to follow KtW, as these bacteria are less susceptible to virus-induced mortality. It is suspected that the gut protects bacteria from infection by providing physical barriers as this environment is only partially liquid.

== Competition and defence specialists ==
In the context of the KtW model, competition specialists are "winners" which grow very quickly relative to other taxa. The mechanism behind KtW describes how competition specialists are controlled by predation by phage, granting the slower-growing "defence specialists" access to the resources. Phages therefor allow competition specialists and defence specialists to co-exist despite resource limitations.

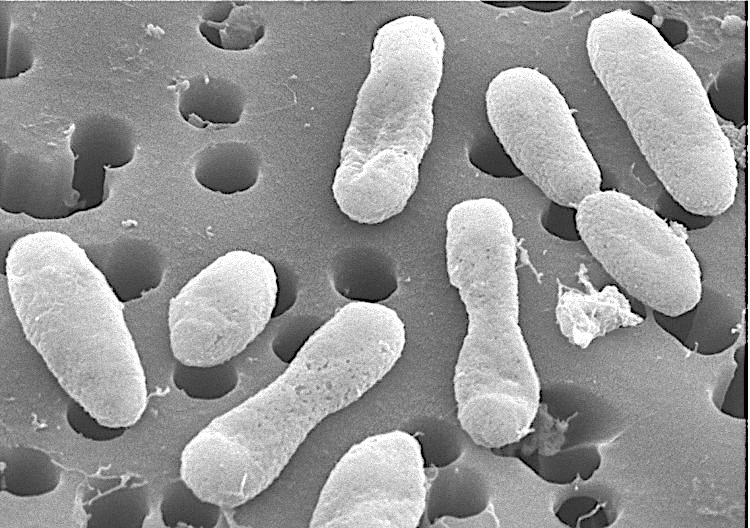
Roseobacter strain belonging to family Rhodobacteraceae

Rhodobacteraceae are a family of bacteria that possess many of the aforementioned qualities of competition specialists. They are fast-growing and tend to exist at low abundances in oligotrophic environments because they are primary targets of viral phages and grazers.

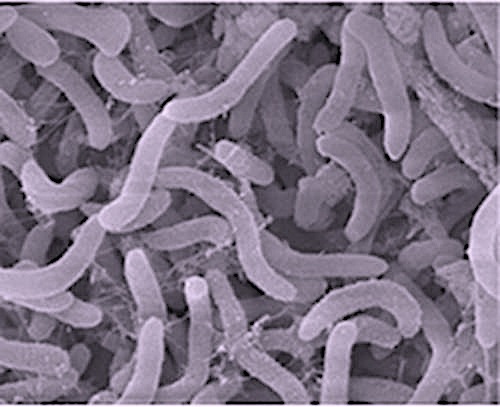
Pelagibacter, a SAR11 bacterium.

Pelagibacterales, or the SAR11 clade, include bacteria that dominate the world's oceans. These organisms are slow-growing. Thus, their ability to maintain such high abundances in the marine environment suggests that they are less vulnerable to viral predation. Accordingly, SAR11 is categorized as a defence specialist.

=== Respiration rate and size ===
With respect to KtW, the moderating effect of viruses on fast-growing competition specialists impacts interpretations of the metabolic activity of bacterial communities at large.

For example, studies of respiration rate among the marine microbe communities of the Gulf of Maine show that Rhodobacteraceae are typically larger than members of the SAR11 clade. Smaller cells sizes are generally less metabolically active and more slow-growing. In 2022, researchers suggested that staining methods may not be sensitive enough to measure the low respiration rates of very abundant, but slow-growing and small bacteria, such as those from the SAR11 clade. Such limitations give the impression that only a small fraction of bacteria are metabolically active or alive. While the respiration rates of larger competition specialists are easier to detect, these taxa tend to be rare as per the conditions of KtW, giving the same impression. Together, these constraints contextualize on-going debates around the aliveness of marine bacterial communities. Size effects and KtW make it difficult to quantify the number of aquatic bacteria that are actively growing in the world's oceans.

== Viruses ==
Marine viruses have different lifestyles which dictate how they interact with their hosts. When lytic viruses infect their hosts, they cause lysis or the bursting of cells; alternatively, lysogenic viruses can integrate into the host genome. Different environmental conditions such as light, temperature, and nutrients may favour one virus lifestyle over the other. In general, infections by lytic viruses are higher in productive waters where viruses can easily reproduce.

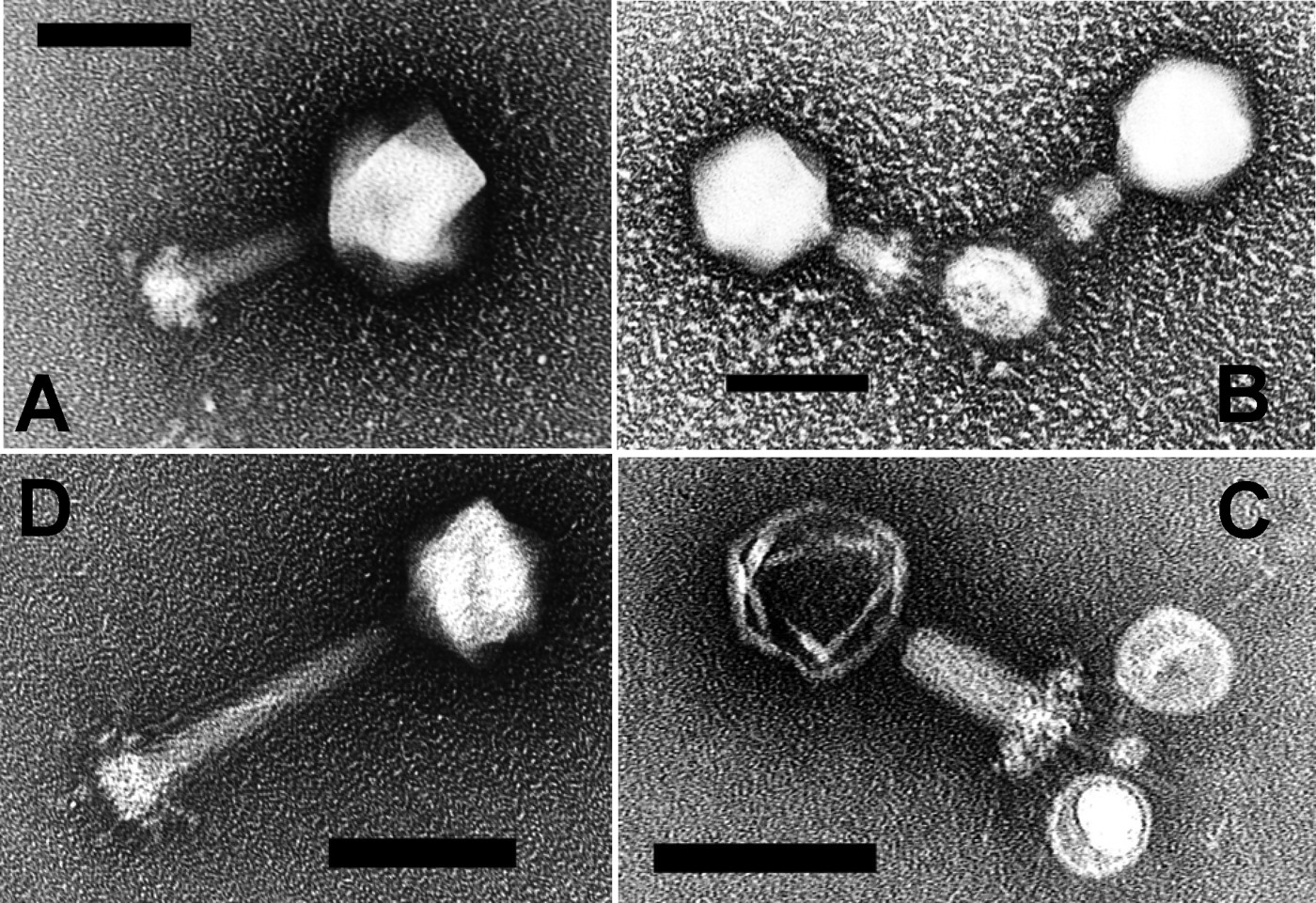
A myovirus which infects cyanobacterium Prochlorococcus.

KtW indicates that competition specialists and defence specialists are infected by viruses with different life cycles. Fast-growing competition specialists are more likely to be infected by r-selected or lytic viruses. Following infection, these viruses replicate quickly, rapidly killing their hosts. Through this rapid viral replication, populations of competition specialists are tightly controlled by viral predation.

Slow-growing defence specialists are more likely to be infected by K-selected or lysogenic viruses. Rather than quickly replicating and killing their hosts, these viruses inhabit the host cell and remain there until environmental conditions are optimal for viral release. As a result, populations of defence specialists remain stable amidst the threat of viral predation.

== Related hypotheses ==
=== Piggyback-the-Winner (PtW) ===
Unlike KtW, the Piggyback-the-Winner (PtW) hypothesis makes a key distinction between lysogenic and lytic viruses and considers viral life cycles. PtW posits that lysogenic viruses are more abundant than lytic viruses when host density is high. Hosts may actively recruit lysogenic viruses, which protect the host from closely related viruses, a phenomenon known as superinfection exclusion. Abundant hosts are parasitized, rather than killed, and high densities of "winners" are maintained.

=== Coevolving KtW model (CKTW) ===
One problematic assumption of the KtW hypothesis is that predator and prey populations are infinite or very large. Given this assumption, the Lotka-Volterra equations would unrealistically imply that neither predators (i.e. viruses) nor prey (i.e. prokaryotes) would go extinct. A 2017 study by Chi Xue and Nigel Goldenfeld tested the effects of the original KtW model on finite populations. Introducing stochasticity into the KtW model resulted in successive viral and prokaryotic extinctions, showing that species coexistence could not be maintained. However, KtW models can be adapted to allow predators and prey to coevolve by mutation. As prey evolve to evade predators and predators evolve to overcome new defences, new mutants are introduced. Thus, Coevolving KtW (CKTW) models allow species diversity to be maintained, even for finite populations.

== See also ==
- Coexistence theory
- Community matrix
- Population dynamics
- Janzen–Connell hypothesis
- Paradox of enrichment
- Paradox of the plankton
