= Depauperate ecosystem =

Area of low biodiversity

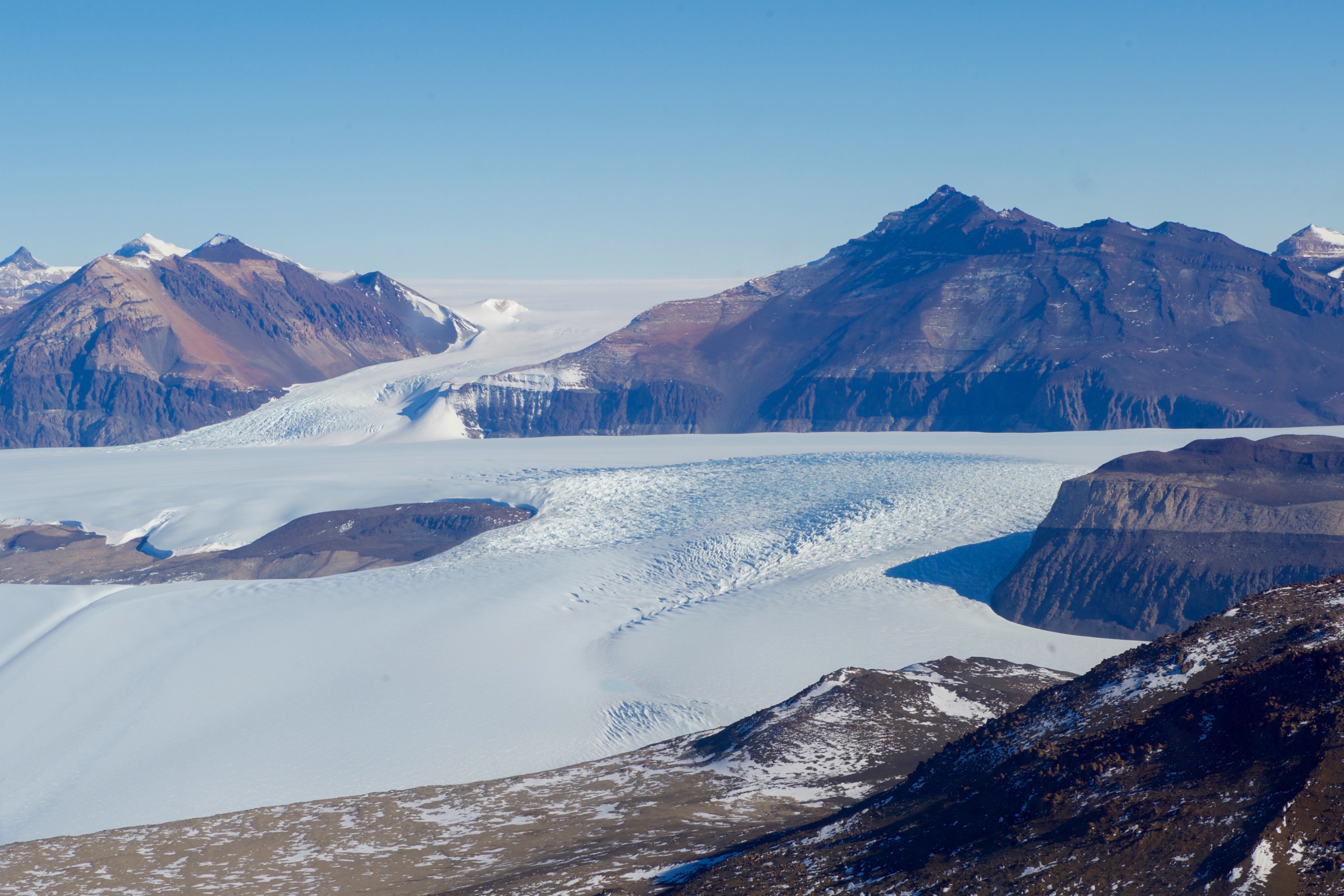
Antarctica is a naturally depauperate ecosystem because of its extreme environment.

A depauperate ecosystem is an ecosystem characterized by low species richness or species diversity. Such ecosystems will have short or simplified food chains and low trophic complexity compared to those with higher biodiversity, often due to low resource availability. However, this simplicity also means that colonizing species may be able to exploit different or broader niches than in their original habitat due to factors such as reduced pressure from predators or reduced resource competition, which can be beneficial for the colonizing species and may eventually lead to greater specialization and speciation. For this reason, depauperate ecosystems are often more vulnerable to invasive species than those with greater diversity.

Depauperate ecosystems may be naturally occurring or man-made. An ecosystem may be naturally depauperate due to physical isolation, as in the case of oceanic islands, or because of extreme environmental conditions that limit the number of viable ecological niches, as in Antarctica. The creation of plantations or other modifications of land for human use can produce depauperate ecosystems where greater biodiversity was formerly present. Depauperate ecosystems are less effective at providing ecosystem services and less resistant to adverse climate events than biodiverse ecosystems. Naturally depauperate ecosystems also present a unique conservation challenge due to their high degree of endemism. Human activity may inadvertently increase biodiversity by introducing new species directly or by altering the environment to be hospitable to a wider range of organisms, which can modify trophic interactions to push out species that may not exist elsewhere.

== Types ==
=== Naturally depauperate ecosystems ===
An ecosystem may be depauperate due to environmental constraints, such as extremes of temperature, limited availability of water or nutrients, frequent disturbance, or high toxicity. Depauperacy may also be result of geographic isolation, which limits dispersal from elsewhere. This includes both oceanic islands, especially those that are more distant from the continental shelf, and isolated patches of one type of habitat surrounded by another that dominates the landscape. For example, small patches of Cerrado savanna within a larger region of denser Amazonian forest represent islands that, due to their size, can support only a portion of the species present in the main region of the Cerrado biome. This habitat fragmentation is naturally occurring as a result of climatic shifts during previous glacial and interglacial periods and differences in soil conditions, rather than the result of human activity. An ecosystem that is not geographically isolated may be functionally isolated due to some other factor, such as naturally acidic freshwater rivers, where acid tolerance is the main limiting factor in establishment of species, resulting in low species diversity and trophic complexity. Such an environment may be depauperate in some taxa and not others, as observed in the ultramafic soils of New Caledonia, which are correlated with low species richness in subterranean ants but support a greater diversity of reptiles and plants compared to other soils on the islands.

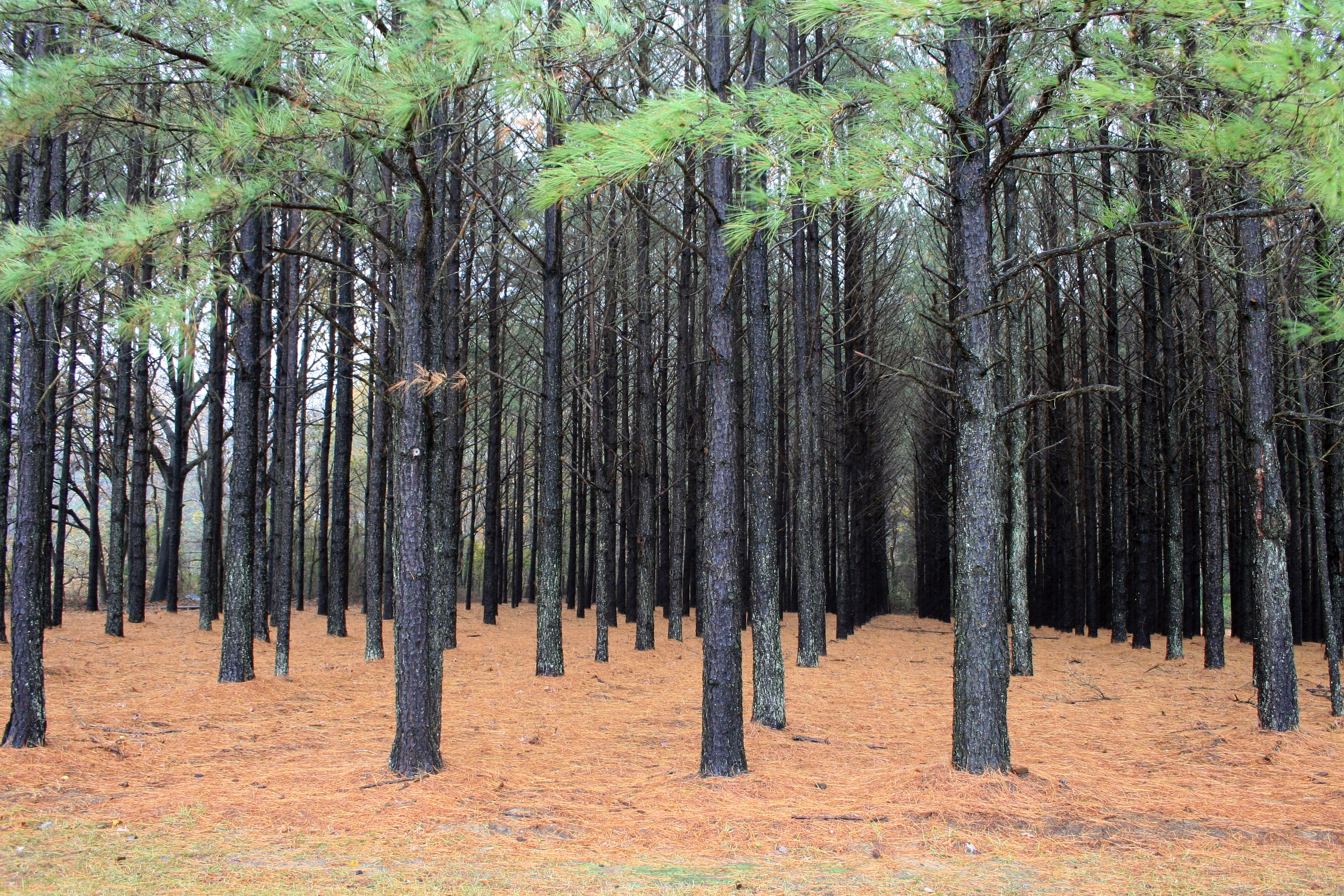
An example of a monoculture pine plantation

=== Degraded ecosystems ===
A historically biodiverse ecosystem may become depauperate due to various types of human activity, including hunting, warfare, industrialization, deforestation and other forms of resource exploitation, road construction, and tourism. Land use changes have been estimated to be the most impactful driver of biodiversity loss in all biomes, with other forms of anthropogenic change such as invasive species, alterations to the nitrogen cycle, and shifts in climate having more variable effects depending on the biome under study. Direct reduction of biodiversity in one taxon can reduce diversity in others and may also have farther-reaching effects. For example, single-species eucalyptus plantations in Argentina support less complex bird communities than either undeveloped pampas or mixed-use agricultural land, and their presence may present an obstacle to dispersal, resulting in increased habitat fragmentation. Losses at one trophic level may affect diversity throughout a trophic cascade. The local extinction of top-level predators removes top-down control of herbivores, leading herbivore populations to grow too large to be sustained by the ecosystem's primary producers, which are depleted as a result. The loss of seed predators or large herbivores, on the other hand, can lead to an overabundance of their primary food source, leading to the competitive exclusion of other plant species.

== Evolution in depauperate ecosystems ==
=== Niche expansion and adaptive radiation ===
The introduction of a new species into a depauperate ecosystem may lead to ecological release due to the reduction of interspecific competition or absence of usual predators, or availability of new prey species or other resources to exploit. Species may shift to a lower trophic level than they occupied in their original habitat due to the shorter food chains that are usually present in depauperate ecosystems. As a result of these shifts, a species will undergo niche expansion through an increase in phenotypic variation among individuals, which may take the form of physical or behavioral changes. When differences among phenotypes are adaptive, such as through resource partitioning, different populations within the ecosystem will become more specialized from one generation to the next, which may result in a radiation of numerous species to exploit niches that were not present in the original habitat if sufficient resources are present to support them. This may be more likely in areas that are thermally or geographically isolated.

=== Endemism ===
Because depauperate ecosystems are often highly isolated, they tend to exhibit high rates of endemism. For example, serpentine soil habitats in California are inhabited by numerous endemic plant species, and these endemics live in harsher soil conditions than the more widespread species found alongside them. The limited resource availability and severe environmental constraints that are typical of depauperate ecosystems exert strong selection pressure on the species within them, and endemic species may bear little resemblance to their close relatives due to the extreme adaptations required for their long-term survival. They are often adapted to extremely specific conditions, such as the narrow range of temperatures that can be tolerated by highly cold- or heat-adapted organisms, which makes them unusually vulnerable to climate change and other ecological disruptions. These adaptations may also be responsible for these organisms' endemism, limiting their ability to disperse beyond the ecosystem in which they evolved; this is known as the competitive trade-off hypothesis.

== Conservation concerns and human impact ==
Anthropogenically depauperate ecosystems are often deprioritized in conservation plans, due to significant levels of degradation that limit the effectiveness of recovery efforts. In some cases the best possible outcome is merely to prevent greater degradation than has already occurred. However, not all degraded ecosystems are equally damaged, and in many cases it is possible to restore lost biodiversity, for example by reducing or ending logging in forests that have lost up to 68% of their biomass. Small improvements in these highly degraded ecosystems may have proportionally larger impacts on biodiversity, though more substantial measures are required for full recovery. Rewilding is one means of restoring an ecosystem that has been made depauperate by human activity, through methods such as reintroducing species that have been extirpated and thereby reversing the loss of trophic complexity.

Though it is not the only determining factor, more complex ecosystems are often more resistant to the establishment of introduced species, making depauperate ecosystems more vulnerable to invasion. Environmental factors that limit biodiversity in naturally depauperate ecosystems may be inadvertently altered by human activity, such as when eutrophication makes an acidic freshwater ecosystem more hospitable to species that do not tolerate acidity well. These generalist species may then outcompete the more specifically adapted native biota, so that greater biodiversity is not necessarily a sign of ecosystem health. Climate change can have a similar effect on ecosystems that are depauperate due to extreme temperatures.

Ecosystems with lower biodiversity are less resistant to productivity loss caused by extreme climate events, are generally less stable over time, and are less effective in the provision of other ecosystem services. When the depletion of higher trophic levels in an ecosystem causes overpopulation in species at lower levels, increased contact with humans can result in the spread of zoonotic diseases.
