= Lottery competition =

Lottery competition in ecology is a model for how organisms compete. It was first used to describe competition in coral reef fish. Under lottery competition, many offspring compete for a small number of sites (e.g., many fry competing for a few territories, or many seedlings competing for a few treefall gaps). Under lottery competition, one individual is chosen randomly to "win" that site (typically becoming an adult soon after), and the "losers" typically die off. Thus, in an analogy to a lottery or raffle, every individual has an equal chance of winning (like every ticket has an equal chance of being chosen), and therefore more abundant species are proportionately more likely to win (just as an individual who buys more tickets is more likely to win).

Some models generalize this idea by weighting some individuals who are more likely to be chosen (by analogy, this would be like some tickets counting as two tickets instead of one). When a population is below carrying capacity, e.g. due to ecological disturbance, then producing twice as many individuals is not identical to producing individuals twice as likely to win; the two specialized groups can coexist in a competition-colonization trade-off.

Lottery competition has been used in understanding many key ideas in ecology, including the storage effect (species coexist because they are affected differently by environmental variation) and neutral theory (species diversity is maintained because species are competitively equivalent, and extinction rates are slow enough to be offset by speciation and dispersal events).
