= IDH =

IDH may refer to:

- Isocitrate dehydrogenase
- Intermediate Disturbance Hypothesis
- Interactive Data Handler
- Intradialytic hypotension
