= R/K selection theory =

Evolutionary hypothesis

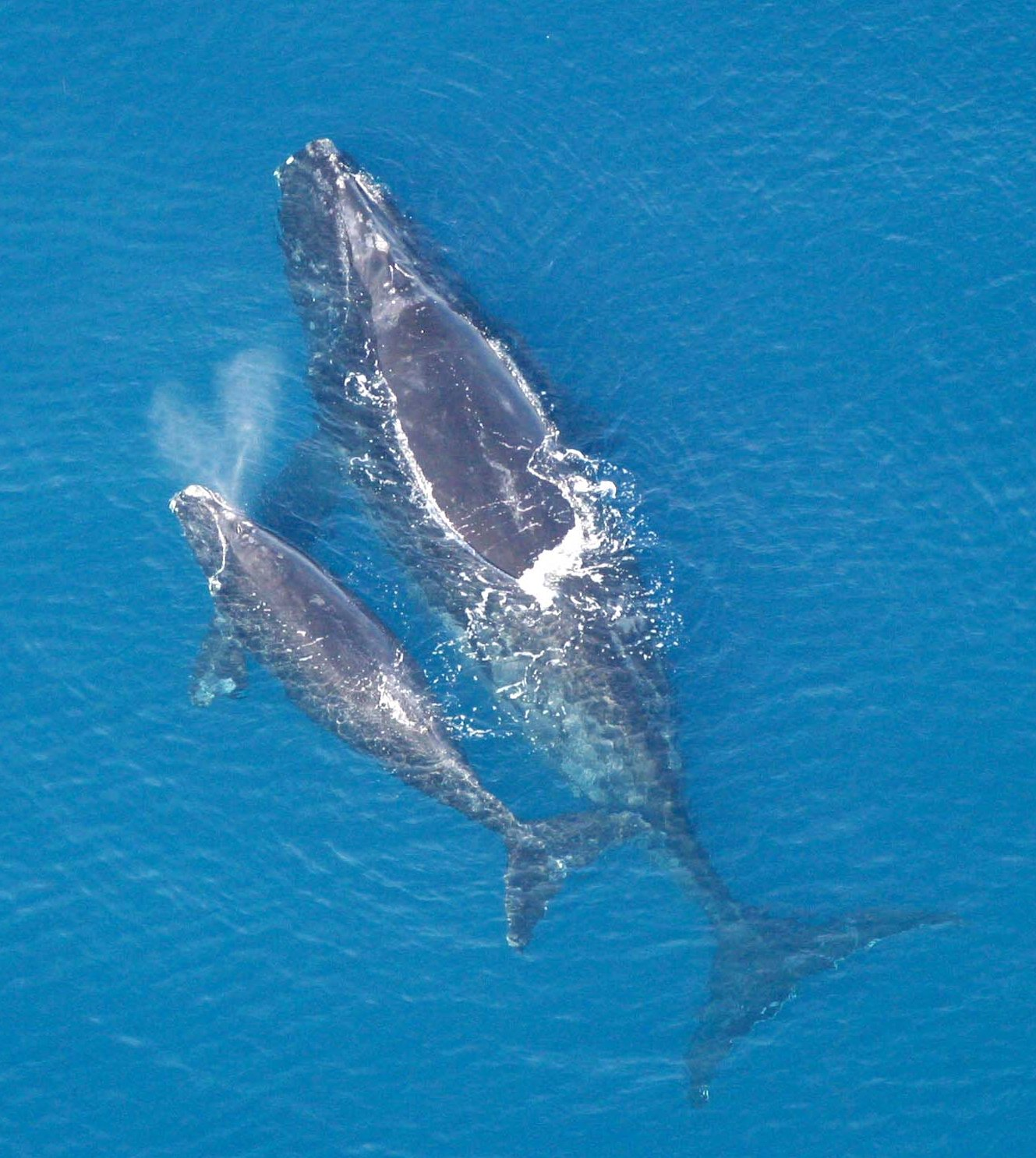
North Atlantic right whale with solitary calf. Whale reproduction follows K-selection strategy, with few offspring, long gestation, long parental care, and a long period until sexual maturity.

The r/K selection theory is an evolutionary hypothesis examining the selection of traits in an organism that trade off between quantity and quality of offspring. Species which produce more offspring at the expense of reduced individual parental investment are termed r-strategists, while those which make greater parental investment at the expense of a reduced quantity of offspring are termed K-strategists. The occurrence of the two varies widely, seemingly to promote success in particular environments.

The concepts of quantity or quality offspring are sometimes referred to in ecology as "cheap" or "expensive", a comment on the expendable nature of the offspring and parental commitment made. The stability of the environment can predict if many expendable offspring are made or if fewer offspring of higher quality would lead to higher reproductive success. An unstable environment would encourage the parent to make many offspring, because the likelihood of all (or the majority) of them surviving to adulthood is slim. In contrast, more stable environments allow parents to confidently invest in one offspring because they are more likely to survive to adulthood.

The terminology of r/K-selection was coined by the ecologists Robert MacArthur and E. O. Wilson in 1967 based on their work on island biogeography; although the concept of the evolution of life history strategies has a longer history (see e.g. plant strategies).

The theory was popular in the 1970s and 1980s, when it was used as a heuristic device, but lost importance in the early 1990s, when it was criticized by several empirical studies. A life history paradigm has replaced the r/K selection paradigm, but continues to incorporate its important themes as a subset of life history theory. Some scientists now prefer to use the terms fast versus slow life history as a replacement for, respectively, r versus K reproductive strategy.

== Overview ==
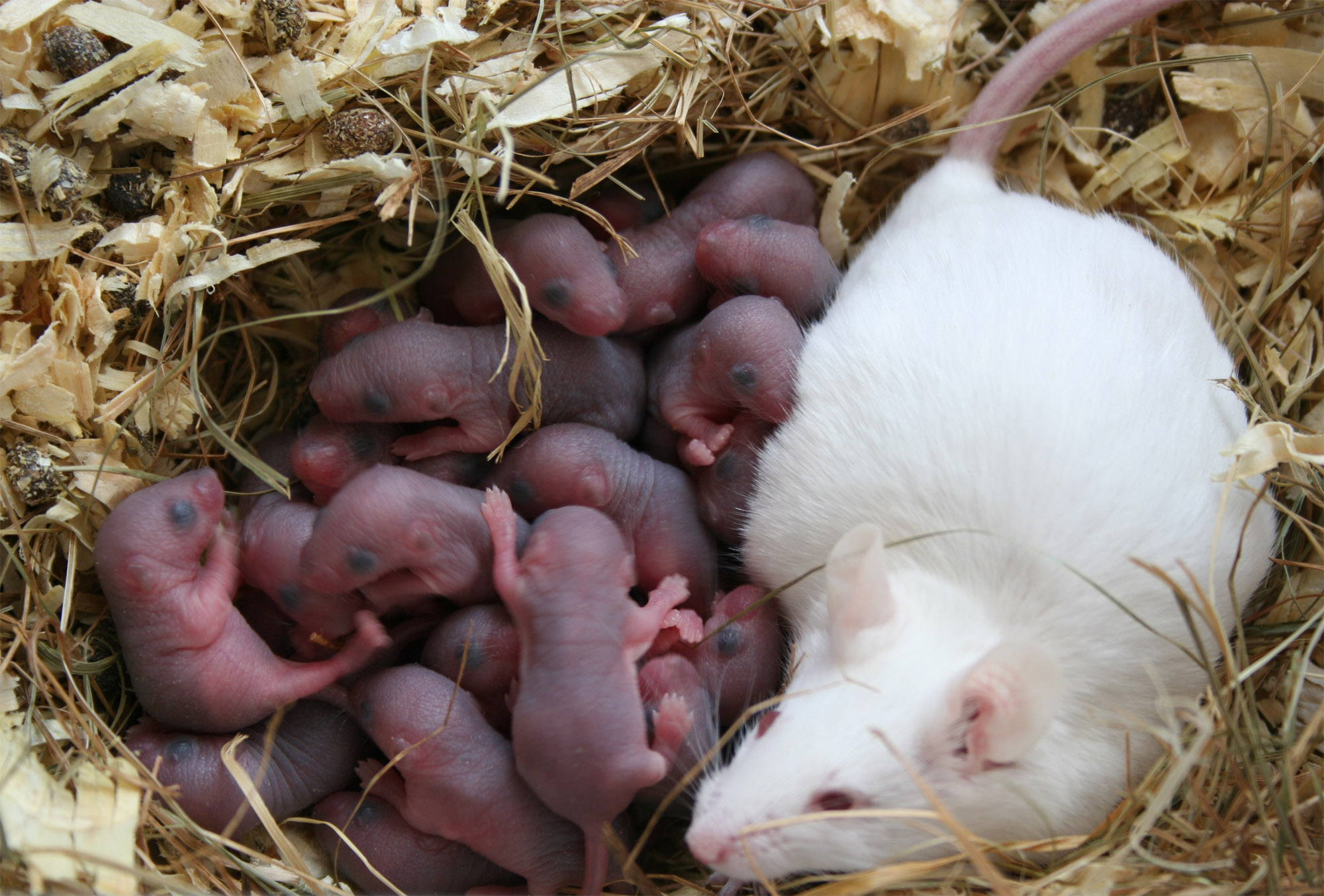
A litter of rats with their mother. The reproduction of rats follows an r-selection strategy, with many offspring, short gestation, less parental care, and a short time until sexual maturity. The same applies to mice.

In r/K selection theory, selective pressures are hypothesised to drive evolution in one of two generalized directions: r- or K-selection. These terms, r and K, are drawn from standard ecological formula as illustrated in the simplified Verhulst model of population dynamics:

$$\frac{\text{d}N}{\text{d}t} = r\ N \left( 1 - \frac{\ N\ }{ K }\right)$$

where N is the population, r is the maximum growth rate, K is the carrying capacity of the local environment (from German Kapazitätsgrenze), and dN /dt (the derivative of population size N with respect to time t) is the rate of change in population with time. Thus, the equation relates the growth rate of the population N to the current population size, incorporating the effect of the two constant parameters r and K. (Note that when the population size is greater than the carrying capacity then 1 - N/K is negative, which indicates a population decline or negative growth.) The choice of the letter K came from the German Kapazitätsgrenze (capacity limit), while r came from rate.

=== r-selection ===
r-selected species are those that emphasize high growth rates, typically exploit less-crowded ecological niches, and produce many offspring, each of which has a relatively low probability of surviving to adulthood (i.e., high r, low K). A typical r species is the dandelion (genus Taraxacum).

In unstable or unpredictable environments, r-selection predominates due to the ability to reproduce rapidly. There is little advantage in adaptations that permit successful competition with other organisms, because the environment is likely to change again. Among the traits that are thought to characterize r-selection are high fecundity, small body size, early maturity onset, short generation time, and the ability to disperse offspring widely.

Organisms whose life history is subject to r-selection are often referred to as r-strategists or r-selected. Groups of organisms known for exhibiting r-selected traits are bacteria, diatoms, insects, grasses, cephalopods, fowl, and rodents.

According to Oscar Horta, due to r-selection, the overwhelming majority of animals die shortly after birth by starving or being eaten alive, which suggests that wild animals' suffering outweighs their happiness.

=== K-selection ===
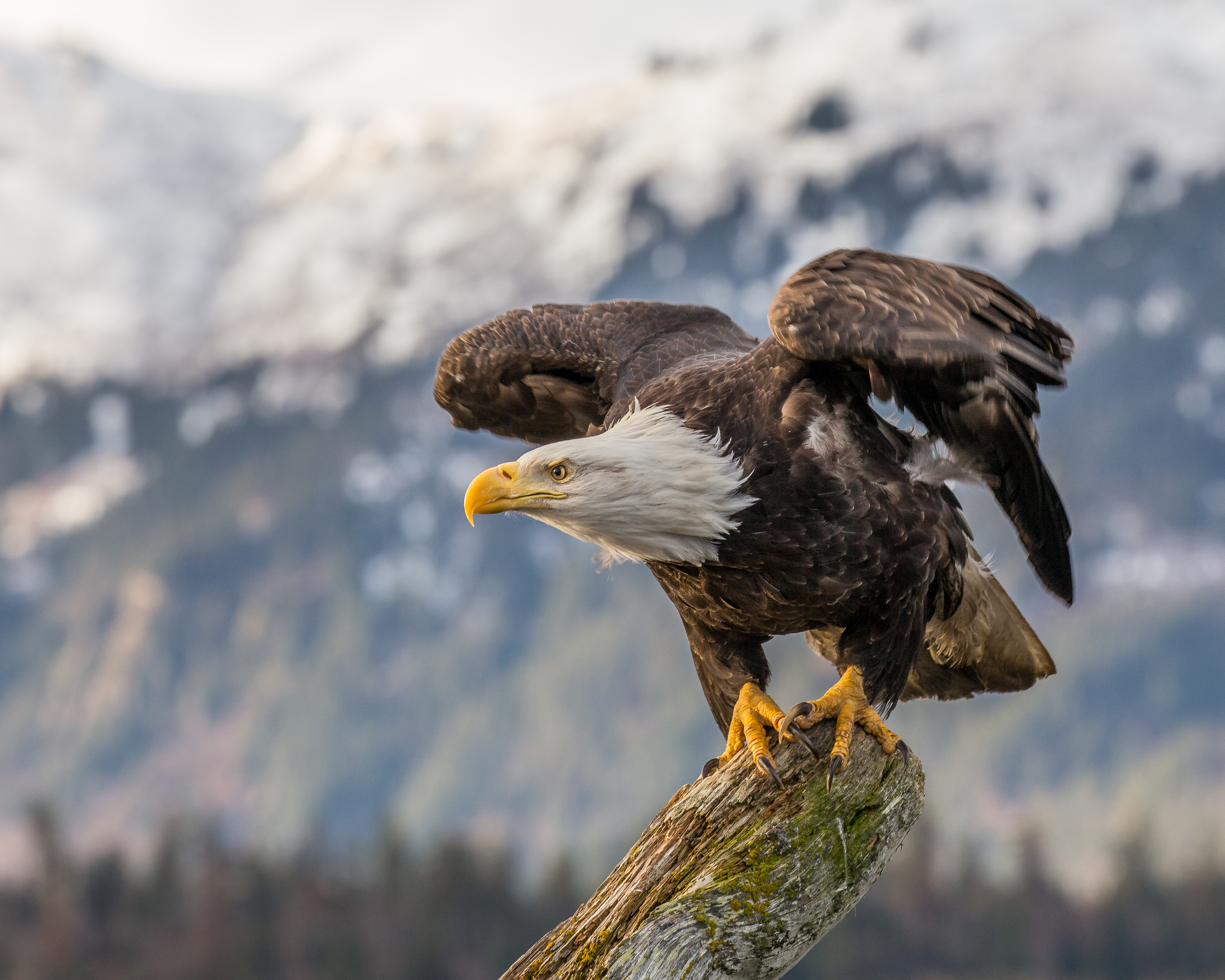
A bald eagle, an individual of a typical K-strategist species. K-strategists have longer life expectancies, produce fewer offspring, and when young tend to be altricial, require extensive care by parents.

By contrast, K-selected species display traits associated with living at densities close to carrying capacity and typically are strong competitors in such crowded niches, that invest more heavily in fewer offspring, each of which has a relatively high probability of surviving to adulthood (i.e., low r, high K). In scientific literature, r-selected species are occasionally referred to as "opportunistic" whereas K-selected species are described as "equilibrium".

In stable or predictable environments, K-selection predominates as the ability to compete successfully for limited resources is crucial and populations of K-selected organisms typically are very constant in number and close to the maximum that the environment can bear (unlike r-selected populations, where population sizes can change much more rapidly).

Traits that are thought to be characteristic of K-selection include large body size, long life expectancy, and the production of fewer offspring, which often require extensive parental care until they mature. Organisms whose life history is subject to K-selection are often referred to as K-strategists or K-selected. Organisms with K-selected traits include large organisms such as elephants, sharks, humans, and whales, but also smaller long-lived organisms such as Arctic terns, parrots, and eagles.

=== Continuous spectrum ===
Although some organisms are identified as primarily r- or K-strategists, the majority of organisms do not follow this pattern. For instance, trees have traits such as longevity and strong competitiveness that characterise them as K-strategists. In reproduction, however, trees typically produce thousands of offspring and disperse them widely, traits characteristic of r-strategists.

Similarly, some mammals such as humans and reptiles such as sea turtles display both r- and K-traits: Although sea turtles are large organisms with long lifespans (provided they reach adulthood), they produce large numbers of unnurtured offspring. Humans tend to exhibit a mix of r- or K selection strategies depending on factors such as local economy and social hierarchy.

The r/K dichotomy can be re-expressed as a continuous spectrum using the economic concept of discounted future returns, with r-selection corresponding to large discount rates and K-selection corresponding to small discount rates.

== Ecological succession ==
In areas of major ecological disruption or sterilisation (such as after a major volcanic eruption, as at Krakatoa or Mount St. Helens), r- and K-strategists play distinct roles in the ecological succession that regenerates the ecosystem. Because of their higher reproductive rates and ecological opportunism, primary colonisers typically are r-strategists and they are followed by a succession of increasingly competitive flora and fauna. The ability of an environment to increase energetic content, through photosynthetic capture of solar energy, increases with the increase in complex biodiversity as r species proliferate to reach a peak possible with K strategies.

Eventually a new equilibrium is approached (sometimes referred to as a climax community), with r-strategists gradually being replaced by K-strategists which are more competitive and better adapted to the emerging micro-environmental characteristics of the landscape. Traditionally, biodiversity was considered maximized at this stage, with introductions of new species resulting in the replacement and local extinction of endemic species. However, the intermediate disturbance hypothesis posits that intermediate levels of disturbance in a landscape create patches at different levels of succession, promoting coexistence of colonizers and competitors at the regional scale.

== Application ==
While usually applied at the level of species, r/K selection theory is also useful in studying the evolution of ecological and life history differences between subspecies, for instance the African honey bee, A. m. scutellata, and the Italian bee, A. m. ligustica. At the other end of the scale, it has also been used to study the evolutionary ecology of whole groups of organisms, such as bacteriophages. Other researchers have proposed that the evolution of human inflammatory responses is related to r/K selection.

Some researchers, such as Lee Ellis, J. Philippe Rushton, and Aurelio José Figueredo, have attempted to apply r/K selection theory to various human behaviors, including crime, sexual promiscuity, fertility, IQ, and other traits related to life history theory. Rushton developed "differential K theory" to attempt to explain variations in behavior across human races. Differential K theory applied to humans has been criticised as being devoid of empirical basis, and has also been described as a key example of scientific racism.

== Status ==
Although r/K selection theory became widely used during the 1970s, it also began to attract more critical attention. In particular, a review in 1977 by the ecologist Stephen C. Stearns drew attention to gaps in the theory, and to ambiguities in the interpretation of empirical data for testing it.

In 1981, a review of the r/K selection literature by Parry demonstrated that there was no agreement among researchers using the theory about the definition of r- and K-selection, which led him to question whether the assumption of a relation between reproductive expenditure and packaging of offspring was justified. A 1982 study by Templeton and Johnson showed that in a population of Drosophila mercatorum under K-selection the population actually produced a higher frequency of traits typically associated with r-selection. Several other studies contradicting the predictions of r/K selection theory were also published between 1977 and 1994.

When Stearns reviewed the status of the theory again in 1992, he noted that from 1977 to 1982 there was an average of 42 references to the theory per year in the BIOSIS literature search service, but from 1984 to 1989 the average dropped to 16 per year and continued to decline. He concluded that r/K theory was a once useful heuristic that no longer serves a purpose in life history theory.

More recently, the panarchy theories of adaptive capacity and resilience promoted by C. S. Holling and Lance Gunderson have revived interest in the theory, and use it as a way of integrating social systems, economics, and ecology.

Writing in 2002, Reznick and colleagues reviewed the controversy regarding r/K selection theory and concluded that:

The distinguishing feature of the r- and K-selection paradigm was the focus on density-dependent selection as the important agent of selection on organisms' life histories. This paradigm was challenged as it became clear that other factors, such as age-specific mortality, could provide a more mechanistic causative link between an environment and an optimal life history (Wilbur et al. 1974; Stearns 1976, 1977). The r- and K-selection paradigm was replaced by new paradigm that focused on age-specific mortality (Stearns, 1976; Charlesworth, 1980). This new life-history paradigm has matured into one that uses age-structured models as a framework to incorporate many of the themes important to the r–K paradigm.

— Reznick, Bryant, and Bashey, 2002

Alternative approaches are now available both for studying life history evolution (e.g. Leslie matrix for an age-structured population) and for density-dependent selection (e.g. variable density lottery model).

== See also ==
- Evolutionary game theory
- Life history theory
- Minimax/maximin strategy
- Ruderal species
- Semelparity and iteroparity
- Survivorship curve
- Trivers–Willard hypothesis
- Wild animal suffering
