= Farooq Azam =

Pakistani professor, researcher, marine biologist

- Born: 1940 (age 85–86); Lahore, Pakistan
- Education: University of Punjab; Czechoslovak Academy of Sciences
- Scientific career
- Fields: Marine Biology and Microbiology
- Workplaces: University of California San Diego, United States

Farooq Azam (born in Lahore, Pakistan ) is a researcher in the field of marine microbiology. He is a distinguished professor at the Scripps Institution of Oceanography of the University of California, San Diego. Farooq Azam grew up in Lahore and received his early education in Lahore. He attended University of Punjab, where he received his B.Sc. in chemistry. He later he received his M.Sc. from the same institution. He then went to Czechoslovakia for higher studies. He received his PhD in microbiology from the Czechoslovak Academy of Sciences. After he received his PhD, Farooq Azam moved to California. Azam was the lead author on the paper which coined the term microbial loop. This 1983 paper involved a synthesis between a number of leaders in the (then) young field of microbial ecology, specifically, Azam, Tom Fenchel, J Field, J Gray, L Meyer-Reil and Tron Frede Thingstad.

In addition to introducing the concept of the microbial loop Azam is responsible for bringing conceptual advances in several areas of marine microbiology. He is a leader in identifying the importance of microscale patchiness in the marine environment, and that bacteria can respond to patchiness in nutrient fields and particulate organic matter. This area of research is now pursued more actively in the field at large with the introduction of advanced digital and single cell imaging. He and then graduate student Kay Bidle also showed that the dissolution of diatom frustules was accelerated by bacteria, as opposed to being a strictly abiotic process as previously thought. He and former post-doctoral researcher Alexandra Worden introduced the concept of Eco-systems Biology in 2004. Eco-systems Biology (or Ecosystems Biology) has since been adopted by the field, empowered by the advent of high-throughput sequencing platforms.

== Honors and awards ==
- 2026 - Kyoto Prize in the category "Basic Sciences - Biology".
- 2019 - Elected to the Academia Europaea (European Academy of Science and Letters)
- 2016 - Elected to the American Academy of the Arts and Sciences
- 2013 - D. C. White Research and Mentoring Award, 2013
- 2006 - John Martin Award, ASLO
- 2006 - Nan-Qiang Forum for Distinguished Scientists Lecture, Xiamen University, PRC
- 2004 - Elected Fellow, American Academy of Microbiology
- 2004 - Doctor of Philosophy, honoris causa, U. Kalmar, Sweden
- 2004 - Excellence in Graduate Teaching Award, Scripps, UCSD
- 2004 - Tiedje Award, International Society for Microbial Ecology
- 2002 - ISI Highly Cited Researcher
- 1997 - C. B. Van Niel Memorial Lecture, Stanford University
- 1996 - Plymouth Marine Sciences Lecture & Medal
- 1996 - Excellence in Research Award, UCSD
- 1995 - Eminent Scholars Series Lecturer, U. South Florida
- 1995 - G. Evelyn Hutchinson Award (ASLO)
- 1985 - Honorary Staff Member, Ecology Institute, Germany
- 1984 - Rosenstiel Medal in Oceanographic Sciences
- 1984 - Steinbach Visiting Scholar, Woods Hole Oceanographic Institute
- 1983 - Distinguished Visiting Scholar, SUNY, Stony Brook
- Antarctic Service Medal of the USA
- Faculty of 1000, Present
