= KTW =

KTW could refer to:

== Transportation ==
- Katowice International Airport, Poland; IATA airport code KTW
- Kentish Town West railway station, England; National Rail station code KTW
- Krung Thep Aphiwat Central Terminal, railway station in Bangkok, abbreviated KTW
- Kotdwara station, India Railways code KTW

== Radio stations ==
- KKDZ, a Seattle, Washington radio station that held the call letters KTW from 1922 to 1975.
- KTRW, a Spokane, Washington radio station that uses the slogan "KTW"

== Others ==
- Kato language; ISO 639-3 code KTW
- KTW, a complex of two high-rise buildings in Katowice, Poland
- KTW Bullet, the original teflon-coated bullet, named after the initials of the inventors
- Klippel–Trénaunay–Weber syndrome
- KTW, initials for "Kunststoffe und Trinkwasser", a German quality standard for rubber and plastic components in contact with drinking water
- Kill the Winner hypothesis in microbiology
