= Disturbance (ecology) =

Event or force driving ecological change via mortality

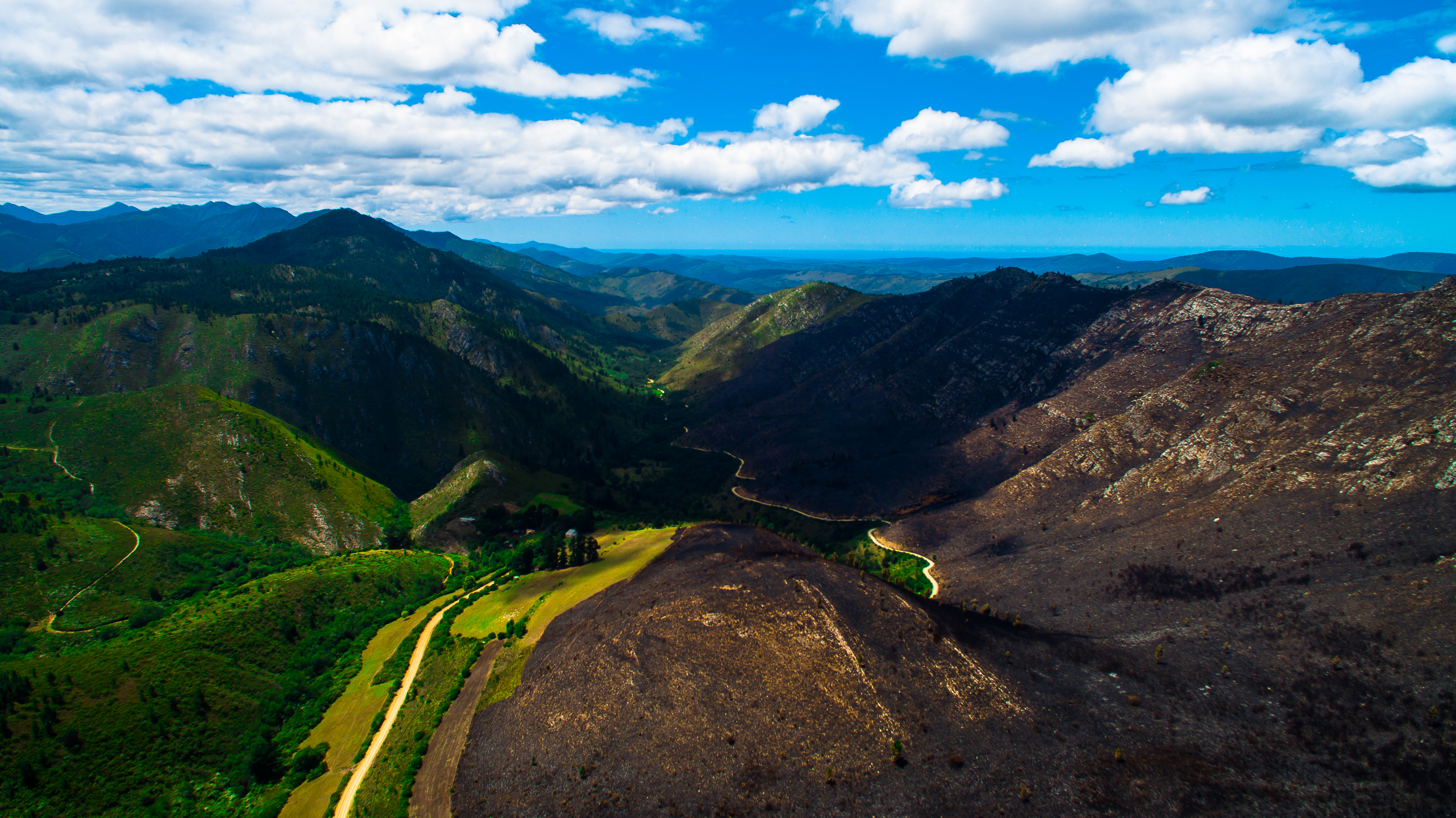
Disturbance of a fire can clearly be seen by comparing the unburnt (left) and burnt (right) sides of the mountain range in South Africa. The veld ecosystem relies on periodic fire disturbances like these to rejuvenate itself.

In ecology, a disturbance is a change in environmental conditions that causes a pronounced change in an ecosystem. Disturbances often act quickly and with great effect, to alter the physical structure or arrangement of biotic and abiotic elements. A disturbance can also occur over a long period of time and can impact the biodiversity within an ecosystem. Ecological disturbances include fires, flooding, storms, insect outbreaks, trampling, human presence, earthquakes, plant diseases, infestations, volcanic eruptions, impact events, etc.

Not only invasive species can have a profound effect on an ecosystem, native species can also cause disturbance by their behavior. Disturbance forces can have profound immediate effects on ecosystems and can, accordingly, greatly alter the natural community’s population size or species richness. Because of these and the impacts on populations, disturbance determines the future shifts in dominance, various species successively becoming dominant as their life history characteristics, and associated life-forms, are exhibited over time.

== Definition and types ==
The scale of disturbance ranges from events as small as a single tree falling, to as large as a mass extinction. Many natural ecosystems experience periodic disturbance that may broadly fall into a cyclical pattern. Ecosystems that form under these conditions are often maintained by regular disturbance. Wetland ecosystems, for example, can be maintained by the movement of water through them and by periodic fires. Different types of disturbance events occur in different habitats and climates with different weather conditions. Natural fire disturbances for example occur more often in areas with a higher incidence of lightning and flammable biomass, such as longleaf pine ecosystems in the southeastern United States. Wildfires, droughts, floods, disease outbreaks, changes in hydrology, tornadoes and other extreme weather, landslides, and windstorms are all examples of natural disturbance events that may form a cyclical or periodic pattern over time.

Other disturbances, such as those caused by humans, invasive species or impact events, can occur anywhere and are not necessarily cyclic. These disturbances can alter the trajectory of change within an ecosystem permanently. Extinction vortices may result in multiple disturbances or a greater frequency of a single disturbance.

=== Anthropogenic disturbance ===
Logging, dredging, conversion of land to ranching or agriculture, mowing, and mining are examples of anthropogenic disturbance. Human activities have introduced disturbances into ecosystems worldwide on a large scale, resulting in widespread range expansion and rapid evolution of disturbance-adapted species. Agricultural practices create novel ecosystems, known as agroecosystems, which are colonized by plant species adapted to disturbance and enforce evolutionary pressure upon those species. Species adapted to anthropogenic disturbance are often known as weeds.

Another example of anthropogenic disturbance is controlled burns used by Native Americans to maintain fire-dependent ecosystems. These disturbances helped maintain stability and biodiversity in ecosystems, enhancing overall ecosystem health and functioning.

Anthropogenic climate change is considered a major source of change in future successional trajectories of ecosystems.

== Effects ==
Immediately after a disturbance there is a pulse of recruitment or regrowth under conditions of little competition for space or other resources. After the initial pulse, recruitment slows since once an individual plant is established it is very difficult to displace. Because scale-dependent relationships are ubiquitous in ecology, the spatial scale modulates the effect of disturbance on natural communities. For example, seed dispersal and herbivory may decrease with distance from the edge of a burn. Consequently, plant communities in the interior areas of large fires respond differently than those in smaller fires. Although disturbance types have varied on ecosystems, spatial scale likely influences ecological interactions and community recovery from all cases because organisms differ in dispersal and movement capabilities.

== Cyclic disturbance ==
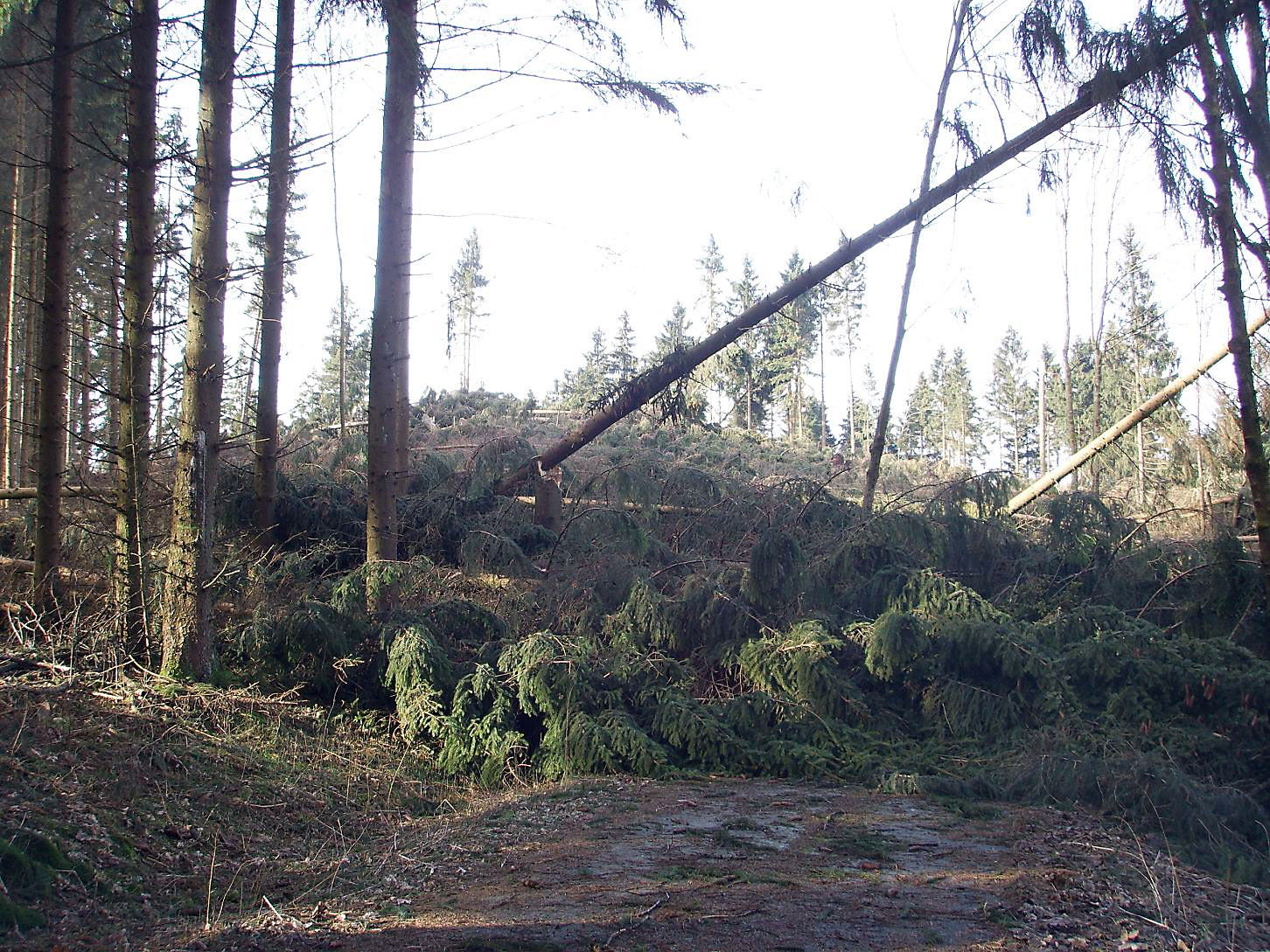
Damages of storm Kyrill in Wittgenstein, Germany

Often, when disturbances occur naturally, they provide conditions that favor the success of different species over pre-disturbance organisms. This can be attributed to physical changes in the biotic and abiotic conditions of an ecosystem. Because of this, a disturbance force can change an ecosystem for significantly longer than the period over which the immediate effects persist. With the passage of time following a disturbance, shifts in dominance may occur with ephemeral herbaceous life-forms progressively becoming over topped by taller perennials herbs, shrubs and trees. However, in the absence of further disturbance forces, many ecosystems trend back toward pre-disturbance conditions. Long lived species and those that can regenerate in the presence of their own adults finally become dominant. Such alteration, accompanied by changes in the abundance of different species over time, is called ecological succession. Succession often leads to conditions that will once again predispose an ecosystem to disturbance.

Pine forests in western North America provide a good example of such a cycle involving insect outbreaks. The mountain pine beetle (Dendroctonus ponderosae) plays an important role in limiting pine trees like lodgepole pine in forests of western North America. In 2004 the beetles affected more than 90,000 square kilometres. The beetles exist in endemic and epidemic phases. During epidemic phases swarms of beetles kill large numbers of old pines. This mortality creates openings in the forest for new vegetation. Spruce, fir, and younger pines, which are unaffected by the beetles, thrive in canopy openings. Eventually pines grow into the canopy and replace those lost. Younger pines are often able to ward off beetle attacks but, as they grow older, pines become less vigorous and more susceptible to infestation. This cycle of death and re-growth creates a temporal mosaic of pines in the forest. Similar cycles occur in association with other disturbances such as fire and windstorms.

When multiple disturbance events affect the same location in quick succession, this often results in a "compound disturbance", an event which, due to the combination of forces, creates a new situation which is more than the sum of its parts. For example, windstorms followed by fire can create fire temperatures and durations that are not expected in even severe wildfires, and may have surprising effects on post-fire succession. Environmental stresses can be described as pressure on the environment, with compounding variables such as extreme temperature or precipitation changes—which all play a role in the diversity and succession of an ecosystem. With environmental moderation, diversity increases because of the intermediate-disturbance effect, decreases because of the competitive-exclusion effect, increases because of the prevention of competitive exclusion by moderate predation, and decreases because of the local extinction of prey by severe predation. A reduction in recruitment density reduces the importance of competition for a given level of environmental stress.

== Species adapted to disturbance (eurytopy) ==
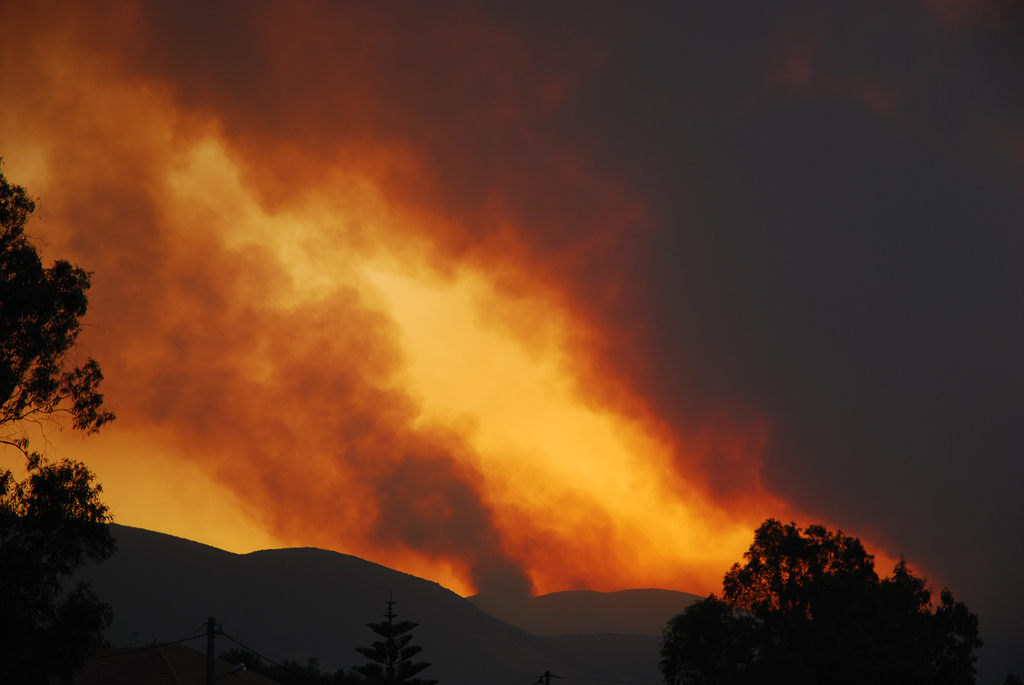
Forest fire burns on the island of Zakynthos in Greece on July 25th, 2007.

A disturbance may change a forest significantly. Afterwards, the forest floor is often littered with dead material. This decaying matter and abundant sunlight promote an abundance of new growth. In the case of forest fires a portion of the nutrients previously held in plant biomass is returned quickly to the soil as biomass burns. Many plants and animals benefit from disturbance conditions. Some species are particularly suited for exploiting recently disturbed sites. Vegetation with the potential for rapid growth can quickly take advantage of the lack of competition. In the northeastern United States, shade-intolerant trees (trees stenotopic to shade) like pin cherry and aspen quickly fill in forest gaps created by fire or windstorm (or human disturbance). Silver maple and eastern sycamore are similarly well adapted to floodplains. They are highly tolerant of standing water and will frequently dominate floodplains where other species are periodically wiped out.

When a tree is blown over, gaps typically are filled with small herbaceous seedlings but, this is not always the case; shoots from the fallen tree can develop and take over the gap. The sprouting ability can have major impacts on the plant population, plant populations that typically would have exploited the tree fall gap get over run and can not compete against the shoots of the fallen tree. Species adaptation to disturbances is species specific but how each organism adapts affects all the species around them.

Another species well adapted to a particular disturbance is the Jack pine in boreal forests exposed to crown fires. They, as well as some other pine species, have specialized serotinous cones that only open and disperse seeds with sufficient heat generated by fire. As a result, this species often dominates in areas where competition has been reduced by fire.

Species that are well adapted for exploiting disturbance sites are referred to as pioneers or early successional species. These shade-intolerant species are able to photosynthesize at high rates and as a result grow quickly. Their fast growth is usually balanced by short life spans. Furthermore, although these species often dominate immediately following a disturbance, they are unable to compete with shade-tolerant species later on and replaced by these species through succession. However these shifts may not reflect the progressive entry to the community of the taller long-lived forms, but instead, the gradual emergence and dominance of species that may have been present, but inconspicuous directly after the disturbance. Disturbances have also been shown to be important facilitators of non-native plant invasions.

While plants must deal directly with disturbances, many animals are not as immediately affected by them. Most can successfully evade fires, and many thrive afterwards on abundant new growth on the forest floor. New conditions support a wider variety of plants, often rich in nutrients compared to pre-disturbance vegetation. The plants in turn support a variety of wildlife, temporarily increasing biological diversity in the forest.

== Importance ==
Biological diversity is dependent on natural disturbance. The success of a wide range of species from all taxonomic groups is closely tied to natural disturbance events such as fire, flooding, and windstorm. As an example, many shade-intolerant plant species rely on disturbances for successful establishment and to limit competition. Without this perpetual thinning, diversity of forest flora can decline, affecting animals dependent on those plants as well.

A good example of this role of disturbance is in ponderosa pine (Pinus ponderosa) forests in the western United States, where surface fires frequently thin existing vegetation allowing for new growth. If fire is suppressed, douglas fir (Pesudotsuga menziesii), a shade tolerant species, eventually replaces the pines. Douglas firs, having dense crowns, severely limit the amount of sunlight reaching the forest floor. Without sufficient light new growth is severely limited. As the diversity of surface plants decreases, animal species that rely on them diminish as well. Fire, in this case, is important not only to the species directly affected but also to many other organisms whose survival depends on those key plants.

Diversity is low in harsh environments because of the intolerance of all but opportunistic and highly resistant species to such conditions. The interplay between disturbance and these biological processes seems to account for a major portion of the organization and spatial patterning of natural communities. Disturbance variability and species diversity are heavily linked, and as a result require adaptations that help increase plant fitness necessary for survival.

=== Relationship to climate change adaptation ===
Disturbance in ecosystems can form a way of modeling future ability of ecosystems to adapt to climate change. Likewise, adaptation of a species to disturbance may be a predictor of its future ability to survive the current biodiversity crisis.

== See also ==
- Environmental disaster
- Ecological resilience
- Ecological succession
- Forest dynamics
- Forest pathology
- Habitat destruction
- Human–wildlife conflict
- Intermediate disturbance hypothesis
- Old-growth forest
- Patch dynamics
- Stressor
