= Alexandra Worden =

American microbiologist

Alexandra Zoe Worden
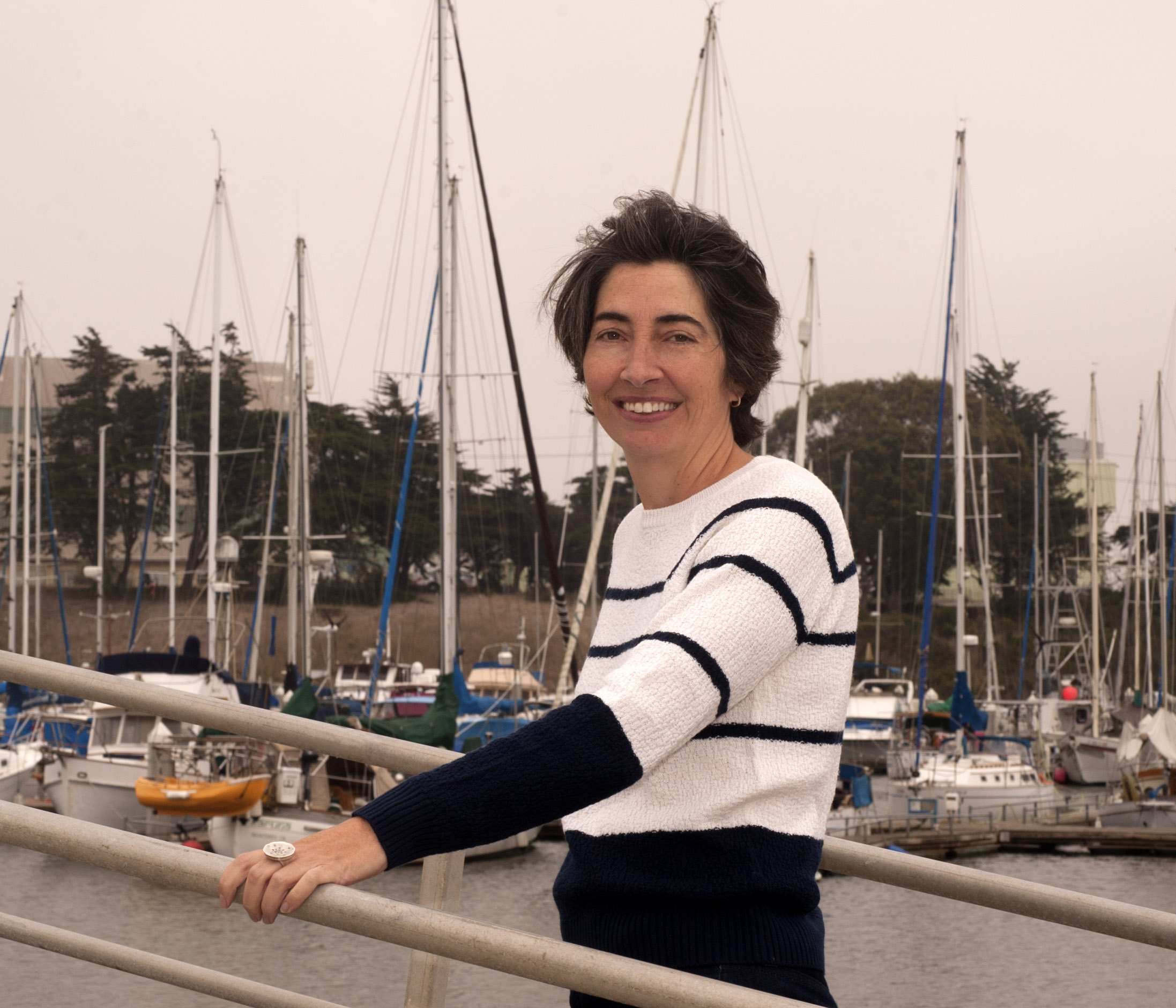
- Worden in 2017
- Born: 1970 (age 55–56); Middlesex County, Massachusetts, U.S.
- Education: Wellesley College
- Known for: work on Biogeochemical cycling, Evolutionary biology
- Scientific career
- Fields: Microbiology, Oceanography
- Workplaces: Marine Biological Laboratory & University of Chicago; Associate, Department of Organismic and Evolutionary Biology, Harvard University; Professor Adjunct, Ocean Sciences Department, University of California, Santa Cruz
- Doctoral advisor: Brian Binder
- Website: https://www.wordenlab.org/

Alexandra (Alex) Zoe Worden (born 1970) is a microbial ecologist and genome scientist known for her expertise in the ecology and evolution of ocean microbes and their influence on global biogeochemical cycles.

== Early life and education ==
Worden was born in 1970, in Middlesex County, Massachusetts. She attended Wellesley College, where she received a B.A. in history and performed a concentration in post-colonial Africa along with Earth, Atmospheric and Planetary Sciences coursework at the Massachusetts Institute of Technology and worked in the laboratories of the marine geochemist and paleoceanographer John M. Edmond, the climate scientist Reginald Newell, and the biological oceanographer Sallie W. Chisholm. She received a Ph.D. in ecology from the Odum School of Ecology at the University of Georgia in Athens, Georgia, in 2000.

Her interests in science came from wanting to understand and answer the scientific questions like the politics involvement in the environment. Her early exposure to engineering came through computer programming at BBN Technologies before attending university and with the Massachusetts Institute of Technology solar electric car project. At the time, the award-winning MIT Solar Electric Vehicle Team included several individuals who then became leading innovators in the tech world, including Gill Pratt and Megan Smith, and the team was founded by Worden's brother, James Worden. Her preferred pronouns are she/her.

== Career ==
Worden started her laboratory in 2004 as assistant professor at the University of Miami's Rosenstiel School of Marine, Atmospheric, and Earth Science in Miami, Florida. In 2007 she was recruited to the Monterey Bay Aquarium Research Institute on the U.S. West Coast while it was under the leadership of Marcia McNutt, who now serves as president of the US National Academy of Sciences. While at MBARI Worden also moved through the ranks to Full Professor Adjunct at the University of California, Santa Cruz (UCSC), and remains Adjunct at UCSC. She then founded the Ocean EcoSystems Biology Unit at the GEOMAR Helmholtz Institute for Ocean Science in Kiel, Germany. She is now a Senior Scientist at the Marine Biological Laboratory and Professor of the Geophysical Sciences at the University of Chicago.

Worden's early awards came from NASA Earth Systems Science Graduate Fellowship and University of Georgia Regents Award as a graduate student. In 2000 she received a US National Science Foundation Microbial Biology Postdoctoral Fellowship in support of her groundbreaking research on picoeukaryotes. Upon founding her lab in 2004 she was awarded a Young Investigator Award.

In 2009, Worden was named a scholar of the Canadian Institute for Advanced Research (CIFAR), later becoming a senior fellow of CIFAR (2011). In 2012, Worden was given a $1 million microbiology research grant to support her studies. She was selected from an international pool of leading scientists as a Gordon and Betty Moore Foundation Marine Investigator in 2013, an award given for her "creativity, innovation, and potential to make major, new breakthroughs". In 2015 and 2016 Worden was a Fellow in Marine and Climate Science at the HWK in Germany. In 2021 she was appointed a Max Planck Fellow at the Max Planck Institute for Evolutionary Biology in Plön and named a Fellow of the Radcliffe Institute for Advanced Study at Harvard University.

Worden is a Fellow of the American Academy of Microbiology, the honorific leadership group of the American Society for Microbiology, elected in 2016. She is a member of the German National Academy of Sciences Leopoldina, elected in 2022. She is also a Fellow of the Association for the Sciences of Limnology and Oceanography, elected in 2024.

Worden is a proponent of STEM education and innovation and has highlighted the need for relevant "...role models to inspire greater diversity and creativity" in science.

=== Research ===
Worden's research focuses on the physiology and ecology of eukaryotic phytoplankton and their roles in the carbon cycle. She initiated this research through an NSF Postdoctoral Fellowship in Microbial Biology and expanded it thereafter by adapting multiple molecular and omic methods to characterize the evolution and ecological contributions of these photosynthetic plankton, which are now known to be major ocean primary producers. At Scripps Institution of Oceanography, a different research pursuit on microbial interactions, while in the laboratory of Farooq Azam, led to her work that overturned the idea that Vibrio cholerae existed primarily attached to copepods in aquatic systems. This was considered important for understanding the ecology of this human pathogen and vectors for transmission of infective cells. During this period she and Azam introduced the concept of Ecosystems Biology (also spelled Eco-systems Biology, EcoSystems Biology or (Eco)-systems Biology), coining the term in a 2004 perspective. The concept was embraced by the scientific community in several later perspectives, and is being pursued by human microbiome-biologist Jeroen Raes and microbial oceanographer Edward DeLong. A Jacques Monod conference on Marine Eco-Systems Biology was initiated in 2015.

Worden pioneered "targeted metagenomics" wherein cells of particular interest are separated from the masses using flow cytometry (on a ship) and genomes are then sequenced from only the cells of greatest interest. Worden developed this innovative technique for analyzing individual protist cells in their natural oceanic environment, thereby bypassing the need to transport samples back to laboratory settings, preventing the potential alterations or loss of biodiversity that often occur during sample handling and storage. This method provided a more accurate and immediate snapshot of marine microbial diversity in its undisturbed state. Using this approach Worden and collaborators at the DOE Joint Genome Institute sequenced partial genomes from a key group of uncultured eukaryotic algae whilst showing the distribution of these photosynthetic protists in the ocean. Most recently, her lab adapted these approaches to study uncultured unicellular predators in the ocean, and discovered giant viruses that infect Choanoflagellates, a widespread predator group related to animals. Remarkably, the viruses bring to the non-photosynthetic, predatory host complete bacteriorhodopsin-like photosystems that pump protons. The authors also highlighted the importance of understanding the cell biological role of the viral rhodopsin photosystem in infected hosts

Her laboratory also investigates ancestral components of land plants, evolutionary biology and distributions of uncultured taxa and interactions between viruses and phytoplankton host cells. In 2015, she and co-authors called for a "rethinking of the marine carbon cycle". In 2025, she published co-authored an article showing Tiny ocean protists, including choanoflagellates, live in partnership with bacteria related to animal pathogens, showing these relationships have a long and changing history. Worden publishes in the fields of environmental microbiology, evolutionary biology, genome science and oceanography.

== Personal life ==
Worden is married and has two children.

== Awards and honors ==
- 2000 NSF Postdoctoral Fellowship
- 2016 Elected Fellow American Academy of Microbiology (American Society of Microbiology)
- 2021 Harvard University Radcliffe Fellow
- 2023 Elected to the German National Academy of Sciences Leopoldina
- 2024 Fellow of the Association for the Sciences of Limnology and Oceanography (ASLO)
- 2026 Guggenheim Fellow
