= Paradox of the plankton =

High plankton diversity despite scarce resources

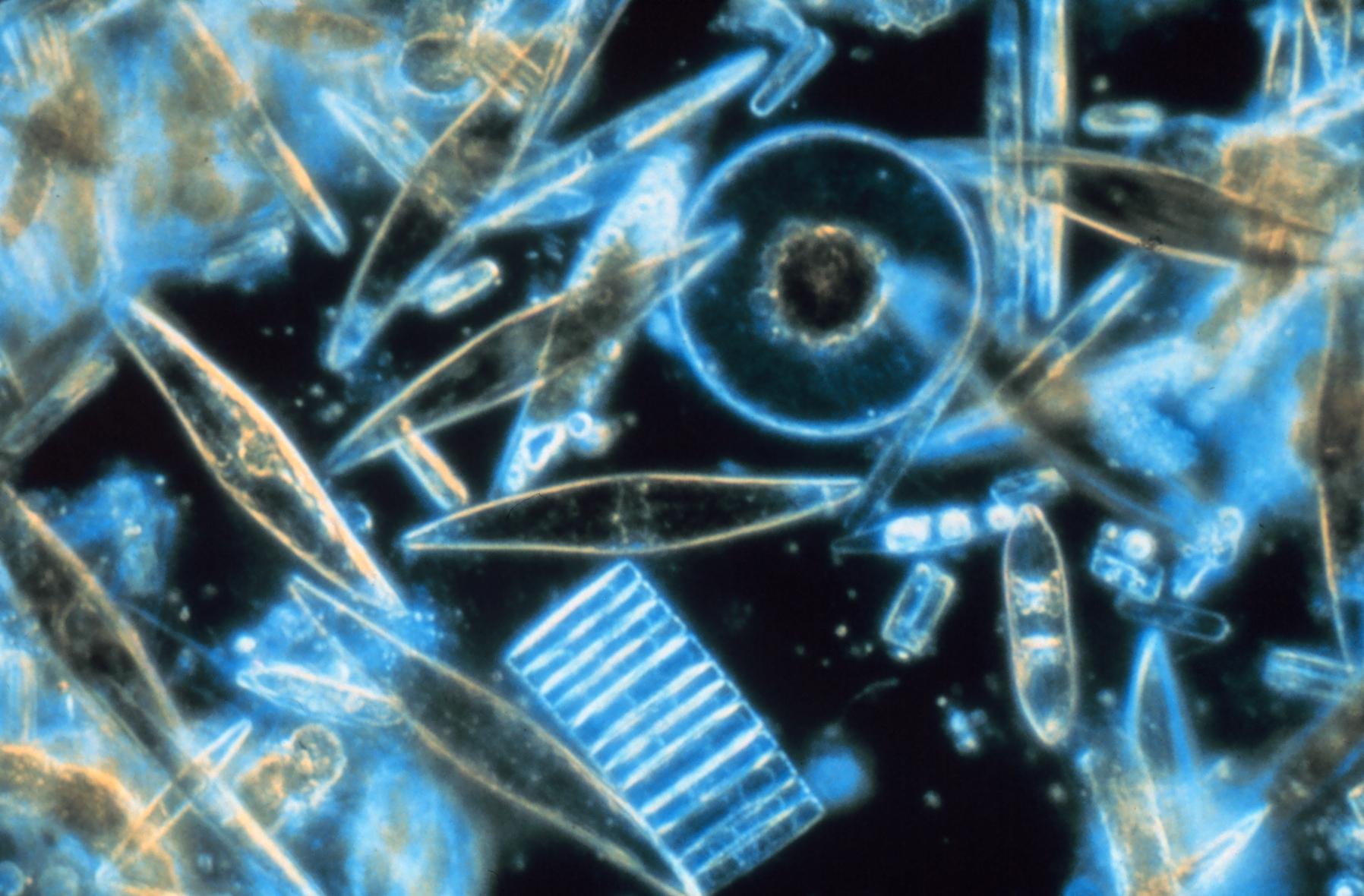
Marine diatoms are among the many planktonic organisms that paradoxically appear to flout the competitive exclusion principle.

In aquatic biology, the paradox of the plankton describes the situation in which a limited range of resources supports an unexpectedly wide range of plankton species, apparently flouting the competitive exclusion principle, which holds that when two species compete for the same resource, one will be driven to extinction.

== Ecological paradox ==
The paradox of the plankton results from the clash between the observed diversity of plankton and the competitive exclusion principle, also known as Gause's law, which states that, when two species compete for the same resource, ultimately only one will persist and the other will be driven to extinction. Coexistence between two such species is impossible because the dominant one will inevitably deplete the shared resources, thus decimating the inferior population. Phytoplankton life is diverse at all phylogenetic levels despite the limited range of resources (e.g. light, nitrate, phosphate, silicic acid, iron) for which they compete amongst themselves. The paradox of the plankton was originally described in 1961 by G. Evelyn Hutchinson, who proposed that the paradox could be resolved by factors such as vertical gradients of light or turbulence, symbiosis or commensalism, differential predation, or constantly changing environmental conditions.

Later studies found that the paradox can be resolved by factors such as: zooplankton grazing pressure; chaotic fluid motion; size-selective grazing; spatio-temporal heterogeneity; bacterial mediation; or environmental fluctuations. In general, researchers suggest that ecological and environmental factors continually interact such that the planktonic habitat never reaches an equilibrium for which a single species is favoured.

While it was long assumed that turbulence disrupts plankton patches at spatial scales less than a few metres, researchers using small-scale analysis of plankton distribution found that these exhibited patches of aggregation (on the order of 10 cm) that had sufficient lifetimes (more than 10 minutes) to enable plankton grazing, competition, and infection.

== Resolution by viral lysis ==
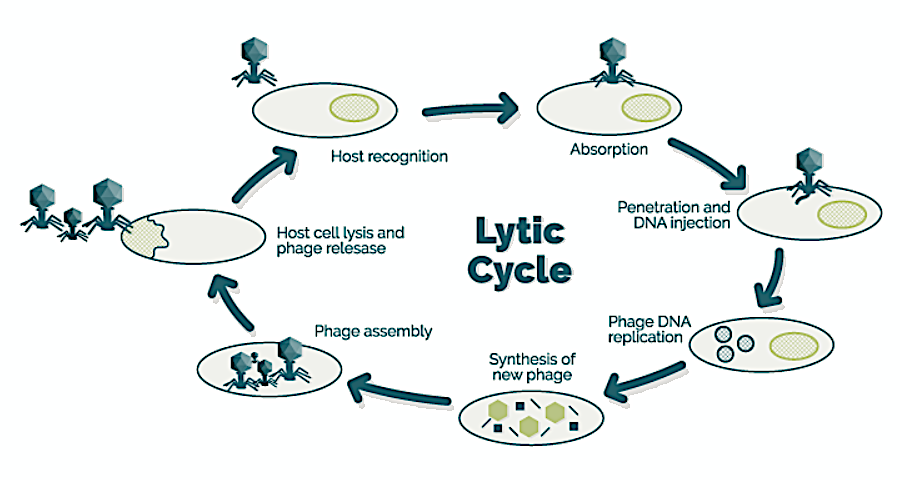
In the lytic cycle, viruses reproduce in host cells to manufacture more viruses; the viruses then burst out of the cell.

One potential resolution to the paradox is the control on plankton populations by marine lytic viruses. Marine viruses play an important role in bacteria and plankton ecology. They are a significant component of biogeochemical cycling and horizontal gene transfer in both bacterial and plankton communities. Viruses are the most abundant organisms in the ocean, and have the capacity to deplete host populations very rapidly. Marine viruses infect specific host species, and therefore an abundance of a virus can quickly and effectively alter the structure of the phytoplankton and bacterial communities. Via the lytic cycle, a virus encounters a host and reproduces until the cell bursts, releasing viruses. Viruses can also enter a lysogenic cycle, in which the virus writes its DNA into the host genome. When a phytoplankton species enters a bloom period, cell concentration increases and many viral targets suddenly become available.

One explanation to the paradox of the plankton is the "Boom-and-busted dynamic" hypothesis, also called "Kill the winner." In a phytoplankton bloom, an individual species multiplies rapidly in ideal conditions, which increases its cell concentration in an area, outcompeting other phytoplankton. This "boom" in host cells creates an opportunity for rapid infection by viruses, leading to a "bust" in which the phytoplankton population rapidly diminishes. This creates a large gap in the local phytoplankton ecology and allows other species to fill in and continue growing. Such population control by viruses creates temporal and spatial diversity in phytoplankton communities. Long term control results, as the virus prevents the formerly dominant species from booming during future bloom events.

== See also ==
- Unified neutral theory of biodiversity
