= Georgy Gause =

Russian biologist

- Born: 27 December 1910; Moscow
- Died: 2 May 1986 (aged 75); Moscow
- Education: Moscow University
- Known for: The competitive exclusion principle
- Awards: Stalin Prize
- Scientific career
- Fields: Biologist, evolutionist, ecologist
- Thesis: Studies on the dynamics of mixed populations (DBiolSc, 1936)

Georgy Frantsevich Gause (Russian: Гео́ргий Фра́нцевич Га́узе; 27 December 1910 – 2 May 1986), was a Soviet and Russian biologist and evolutionist, who proposed the competitive exclusion principle, fundamental to the science of ecology. Classic of ecology, he would devote most of his later life to the research of antibiotics.

== Early life ==
Gause was born on 27 December 1910, in Moscow, Russia to Frants Gustavovich Gause, a professor of architecture at Moscow State University, and Galina Gause, an industrial worker at an automotive steel plant. As a boy and into his teenage years, Gause and his extended family took summer vacations to the Caucasus Mountains in southern Russia for months at a time. Although his family was not wealthy, they were allowed these respites because his father, being a government architect, helped to build many structures at the university. It was during these trips to the Caucasus Mountains that Gause grew fond of nature, often chronicling the lives and behavior of several organisms, including the Siberian grasshopper (Aeropus sibiricus). He became interested in zoology, particularly animal variability.

== At university ==
In 1927 Gause was admitted to the Biological Division of the Faculty of Physics and Mathematics at Moscow University. The Russian university system requires a faculty advisor for all undergraduate and graduate students. His chosen advisor for his undergraduate career was professor Vladimir Alpatov, who worked at the Zoological Museum of Moscow University. In the mid-1920s Alpatov was very impressed by the work of Raymond Pearl, a U.S. demographer who became well-known through his advocacy of the logistic curve. Alpatov stimulated a fascination for American science that greatly influenced Gause. Gause argued that field work, with too many variables, could never adequately explain this relationship and only in the simplified laboratory environment, where variables could be controlled, would it be possible to determine precisely how a specific ecological factor influences a population. Eager to pursue this mechanistic direction of study and influenced by his advisor, Gause contacted Pearl to see if he would take on another Russian student. He applied for a fellowship through the Rockefeller Foundation but was denied, perhaps because he was only 22 years old. He then published a monograph The Struggle for Existence in 1934 to improve his chances but he was still denied. The monograph had several editions, and it was also translated in French and Japanese languages.

During Alpatov's stay in the US, Gause was supervised by Evgenii Smirnov. Interested in the application of statistics in biosystematics, Smirnov promoted these methods to Gause. In that period Gause investigated the distribution of Orthoptera in the North Caucasus, quantitatively estimating ecoplastisity of species.

Gause earned his BSc at Moscow State University in 1931, and was employed in Alpatov's laboratory at the Zoological Institute of Moscow University. He earned his DBiolSc in 1936 for the series of works published in 1930-1934 and compiled as a dissertation titled Studies on the dynamics of mixed populations. One of the opponents was Vladimir Vernadsky.

== The struggle for existence by competitive exclusion ==
In 1932, Gause published what has become known as the competitive exclusion principle, based on experimental work on mixed cultures of both yeast and Paramecium species. Aphoristically, it was formulated as "One niche — one species". The principle asserts that no two species with similar ecological niches can coexist in a stable equilibrium, meaning that when two species compete for exactly the same requirements, one will be slightly more efficient than the other and will reproduce at a higher rate as a result. The fate of the less efficient species is local extinction.

In another series of experiments with the infusorians Paramecium as prey and Didinium as a predator, imitating periodical migrations, he obtained nearly ideally sinusoidal fluctuations of the abundances in this model, previously modeled only theoretically. It appeared in English as an abridged version in USA, and finally published in Russian only in 1984.

Gause also obtained the first evidence for the advantages of polycultures was also by on Paramecium. He studied ecologically similar species of infusorians. Keeping them as monocultures he obtained higher abundances of individual species than in polyculture. Meanwhile, the overall abundance of the polyculture was significantly higher.

In 1940 Gause prepared a monograph Ecology and some problems of the origin of species. The original manuscript in Russian was not published, o account of the start of World War II in the Soviet Union. It appeared in as an abridged version in USA, and finally published in Russian only in 1984.

== Protoplasm asymmetry ==
In the 1930s Gause conducted a series of studies of protoplasm asymmetry. This work raised interest among biogeochemists, including V.V. Vernadsky.

== The search for new antibiotics ==
From 1939 Gause began to study antibiotics. This may seem to be a sudden change in research topic, but it was a development of his interests in the struggle for survival, and antibiotic activity was a mean. Later he focused his research on practical applications for his new principle and turned to microbiology and medical science. Working with a strain of Bacillus brevis, he noticed an inhibition on the growth of Staphylococcus aureus when the two were in mixed culture. The inhibition of S. aureus was caused by a metabolite produced by B. brevis. Gause isolated this product and named it Gramicidin S. The antibiotic went into mass production during World War II and saved many lives. For his part in its development, Gause was awarded the Stalin Prize and named director of the Institute for New Antibiotics in Moscow in 1946. As director, Gause helped to design and manufacture many novel antibiotics of which a few had anti-tumor capacities. Due to such abrupt change in scientific interests many biologists failed to realize that the evolutionist and the microbiologist were the same person.

== See also ==
- Competitive Lotka–Volterra equations
