= Intermediate disturbance hypothesis =

Ecological hypothesis about species diversity

The intermediate disturbance hypothesis (IDH) suggests that local species diversity is maximized when ecological disturbance is neither too rare nor too frequent. At low levels of disturbance, more competitive organisms will push subordinate species to extinction and dominate the ecosystem. At high levels of disturbance, due to frequent forest fires or human impacts like deforestation, all species are at risk of going extinct. According to IDH theory, at intermediate levels of disturbance, diversity is thus maximized because species that thrive at both early and late successional stages can coexist. IDH is a nonequilibrium model used to describe the relationship between disturbance and species diversity. IDH is based on the following premises: First, ecological disturbances have major effects on species richness within the area of disturbance. Second, interspecific competition results in one species driving a competitor to extinction and becoming dominant in the ecosystem. Third, moderate ecological scale disturbances prevent interspecific competition.

The hypothesis is ambiguous with its definitions of the terms "intermediate" and "disturbance". Whether a given disturbance can be defined as "intermediate" inherently depends on the previous history of disturbances within a given system, as well as the component of disturbance that is evaluated (i.e. the frequency, extent, intensity, or duration of the disturbances).

Graph shows principles of intermediate disturbance hypothesis: I. at low levels of ecological disturbance species richness decreases as competitive exclusion increases, II. at intermediate levels of disturbance, diversity is maximized because species that thrive at both early and late successional stages can coexist, III. at high levels of disturbance species richness is decreased due to an increase in species movement.

Disturbances act to disrupt stable ecosystems and clear species' habitat. As a result, disturbances lead to species movement into the newly cleared area. Once an area is cleared there is a progressive increase in species richness and competition takes place again. Once disturbance is removed, species richness decreases as competitive exclusion increases. "Gause's Law", also known as competitive exclusion, explains how species that compete for the same resources cannot coexist in the same niche. Each species handles change from a disturbance differently; therefore, IDH can be described as both "broad in description and rich in detail". The broad IDH model can be broken down into smaller divisions which include spatial within-patch scales, spatial between-patch scales, and purely temporal models. Each subdivision within this theory generates similar explanations for the coexistence of species with habitat disturbance. Joseph H. Connell proposed that relatively low disturbance leads to decreased diversity and high disturbance causes an increase in species movement. These proposed relationships lead to the hypothesis that intermediate disturbance levels would be the optimal amount of disorder within an ecosystem. Once K-selected and r-selected species can live in the same region, species richness can reach its maximum. The main difference between both types of species is their growth and reproduction rate. These characteristics attribute to the species that thrive in habitats with higher and lower amounts of disturbance. K-selected species generally demonstrate more competitive traits. Their primary investment of resources is directed towards growth, causing them to dominate stable ecosystems over a long period of time; an example of K-selected species the African elephant, which is prone to extinction because of their long generation times and low reproductive rates. In contrast, r-selected species colonize open areas quickly and can dominate landscapes that have been recently cleared by disturbance. An ideal examples of r-selected groups are algae. Based on the contradictory characteristics of both of these examples, areas of occasional disturbance allow both r and K species to benefit by residing in the same area. The ecological effect on species relationships is therefore supported by the intermediate disturbance hypothesis.

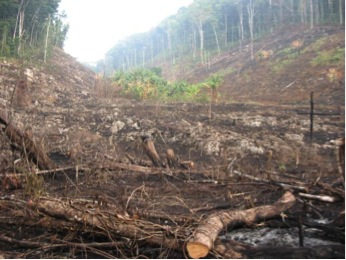
Disturbed vegetation due to milpa farming. Cayo District, Belize. [Macrae 2008].

== History ==
David Wilkinson gives a thorough history of the hypothesis in his paper titled, "The disturbing history of the intermediate disturbance". In this paper, he explains that the idea of disturbance relating to species richness can be traced back to the 1940s in Eggeling 1947, Watt 1947, and Tansley 1949. Though studies supporting the hypothesis began in the 1960s, the first concrete statements of the intermediate disturbance hypothesis didn't occur until the 1970s. The hypothesis was initially illustrated using what has been referred to as a "hump-backed model", which graphed the proposed relationship between diversity and disturbance. This graph appeared first in Grime's 'Competitive exclusion in herbaceous vegetation' where it was used to show the relationship between species density and both environmental stress and intensity of management. The graph appears again in Horn's 'Markovian properties of forest succession' and Connell's 'The influence of interspecific competition and other factors on the distribution of the barnacle'. Though Grime was the first to provide a model for the relationship and Horn was the first to explicitly state the hypothesis, Connell is generally cited in text books and journals as the founder of the hypothesis.

The hypothesis caused concern among the marine science community because of the discrepancy with the 1976 Competition/Predation/Disturbance model proposed by Menge and Sutherland In this model, low disturbance influences high predation and high disturbance creates low predation, causing competitive exclusion to take place. Menge & Sutherland formulated a new model, one that incorporated Connell's ideas in a two part graph published in The American Naturalist (1987). This model proposes that predation, competition, and disturbance are all responsible for shaping the diversity of a community under certain circumstances.

Research regarding the effects of intermediate disturbance is ongoing. More recently, the intermediate disturbance hypothesis has been examined in marine and freshwater ecosystems and protist microcosms.

== Support and critiques ==
Debates over the validity of the IDH are ongoing within the discipline of tropical ecology as the theory is tested in various ecological communities. Other evidence exists for and against the hypothesis. The intermediate disturbance hypothesis has been supported by several studies involving marine habitats such as coral reefs and macroalgal communities. In shallow coastal waters off of south-west Western Australia, a study was conducted to determine whether or not the extremely high diversity observed in macroalgal communities was due to disturbance from waves. Using a numerical wave model to estimate the forces caused by waves, researchers were able to determine that there was a significant relationship between species diversity and disturbance index; this is consistent with the intermediate disturbance hypothesis. Furthermore, diversity was lower at exposed offshore sites where disturbance from waves was highest, and at extremely sheltered site where disturbance from waves was minimized. The study provided evidence that biodiversity in microalgal reef communities possess some relationship with their proximity to the outer edge of lagoon systems typical of the Western Australian coast. While this study may have been localized to the Western Australian coast, it still provides some evidence to support the validity of the IDH. Research using an individual-based, eco-evolutionary system demonstrates disturbance on small spatial scales increases species richness.

Additionally, a study done in the Virgin Islands National Park found that species diversity, in some locations, of shallow coral reefs increased after infrequent hurricane disturbance. In 1982, reefs in Kona, Hawaii were reported to have an increase in diversity after a moderate storm, although the effects of the storm varied with the reef zones. In 1980, Hurricane Allen increased species diversity in shallow zones of the Discovery Bay Reef in Jamaica because the more dominant corals were reduced; giving the other types a chance to propagate following the disturbance. Similar findings have been reported in shallow reefs in which dominant species of coral have suffered more damage than the less common species. While more long-term studies are required to completely support the Intermediate Disturbance Hypothesis, the studies that have been conducted thus far have proven that IDH does have some validity while attempting to describe the relationship between diversity and the rate of occurrences of disturbance in an area. Moreover, a study was conducted in Fynbos, South Africa to test the intermediate disturbance hypothesis over different spatial scales ranging from 1 m^2 to 0.1 hectares. Fynbos is a place where fire is one of the most prevailing disturbance. However, the intermediate fire frequency regime had lower species richness than did the frequently burned sites. It was also found that community heterogeneity was highest at the least frequently burned sites and lowest at the sites that experienced an intermediate fire frequency.

Even though the IDH was designed for species-rich environments, like tropical rainforests, "most studies that evaluate the IDH are based on limited data with: few species, a limited range of disturbance and/or only a small geographic area, compared with the scale of interest". In this experiment, Bongers, Poorter, Hawthorne, and Sheil evaluate the IDH on a larger scale and compare different tropical forest types in Ghana. Their dataset consisted of 2504 one-hectare plots with a total of 331,567 trees. These plots were divided classified into three forest types: wet (446 plots), moist (1322 plots), and dry forest (736 plots). They found that diversity does peak at intermediate level of disturbance but little variation is explained outside dry forests. Therefore, disturbance is less important for species diversity patterns in wet tropical rain forests than previously thought. The number of species was about the same for each forest type, and wet forests had only slightly fewer pioneer species, slightly more shade-tolerant and an equal number of pioneer light-demanders compared with the moist and dry forests. Their results generally supported the IDH as an explanation of why diversity varies across sites, but concluded that disturbance is less important for species richness patterns in wet tropical rain forests than previously thought.

IDH has been subject to criticism since its inception but not to the degree that other species density hypotheses have been. Recently there has been a call for a critical reassessment of IDH. Criticisms have focused on the increasing amount of empirical data that disagrees with IDH. This can be found within approximately 80% of over 100 reviewed studies that are examining the predicted peak of diversity in intermediate disturbance levels. The rationales behind these discrepancies have been leveled at the simplicity of IDH and its inability to grasp the complexity found within the spatial and intensity aspects of disturbance relationships. In addition, many IDH proven circumstances have been suggested to be a reflection of skewed research methods based on researchers looking for humped diversity-disturbance relations only in systems where they believed it has occurred. Other criticisms are suggesting several subtle theoretical issues with IDH. First, while disturbances weaken competition by reducing species densities and per-capita growth rates, it also reduces the strength of competition needed to push per capita growth into a negative territory and reduce density to zero. Second, intermediate disturbances slow competitive exclusion by increasing the long-term average mortality rate, and thereby reducing the differences in the average growth rates of competing species. The difference in the growth rates between competitively superior and inferior species determines the rates of competitive exclusion; therefore intermediate disturbances are affecting species' abundance but not coexistence. Third, intermediate disturbances temporarily affect relative species fitness. However, no matter what the rate of disturbance is, the species with favored fitness will out-compete the rest of the species.

Several alternative hypotheses have been proposed. One example is by Denslow, who states that the species diversity in a disturbance-mediated coexistence between species is maximized by the presence of a disturbance regime resembling the historic processes. This is because species generally adapt to the level of disturbance in their ecosystem through evolution (whether disturbance is of high, intermediate or low level). Many species (e.g. ruderal plants and fire-adapted species) even depend on disturbance in ecosystems where it often occurs.

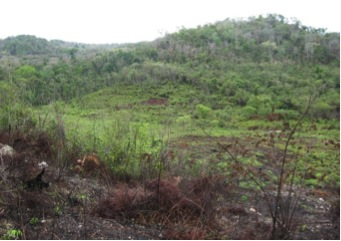
(Disturbed vegetation due to milpa farming, Contreras Valley, Cayo District, Belize [Macrae 2010].

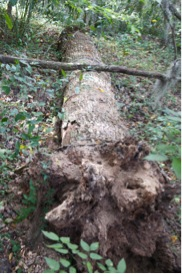
Disturbance due to tree fall, Gainesville, Florida [Daniel 2012].

== See also ==
- Competition-colonization trade-off
- Ecological succession
- Habitat fragmentation
- Patch dynamics
- Wood-pasture hypothesis
