= Tron Frede Thingstad =

Norwegian scientist (born 1946)

Tron Frede Thingstad (born 1946) is a Norwegian scientist. Professor Thingstad is leading a research group on marine microbiology at the Department of Biology, University of Bergen. His work has facilitated understanding the role of microbes in marine ecosystems, including the microbial loop.

In 2009, Thingstad was awarded the prestigious ERC Advanced Investigators Grant to the project "MINOS" (MIcrobial Network OrganiSation), which is focused on microbial networks in the ocean. In 2010, Thingstad received the "Prize for Outstanding Research" of the Norwegian Research Council (informally known as the "Møbius Prize"). According to the jury, his research "has contributed to deeper understanding of topics within marine microbiology, biodiversity, climate research, and ocean acidification". He is also a member of the Norwegian Academy of Science and Letters.

== Selected bibliography ==
- Bratbak, Gunnar; Mikal Heldal; Svein Norland; T. Frede Thingstad (1990). "Viruses as partners in spring bloom microbial trophodynamics". Applied and Environmental Microbiology. 56 (5): 1400–1405. Bibcode:1990ApEnM..56.1400B. doi:10.1128/aem.56.5.1400-1405.1990. PMC 184418. PMID 16348190.
- Thingstad, T. F.; Lignell, R. (1997). "Theoretical models for the control of bacterial growth rate, abundance, diversity and carbon demand". Aquatic Microbial Ecology. 13: 19–27. doi:10.3354/ame013019.
- Thingstad, T. Frede (2000). "Elements of a theory for the mechanisms controlling abundance, diversity, and biogeochemical role of lytic bacterial viruses in aquatic systems". Limnology and Oceanography. 45 (6): 1320–1328. Bibcode:2000LimOc..45.1320T. doi:10.4319/lo.2000.45.6.1320. JSTOR 2670525.
- Torsvik, V.; Øvreås, L.; Thingstad, T. F. (2002). "Prokaryotic Diversity--Magnitude, Dynamics, and Controlling Factors". Science. 296 (5570): 1064–1066. Bibcode:2002Sci...296.1064T. doi:10.1126/science.1071698. PMID 12004116.
