= Competition–colonization trade-off =

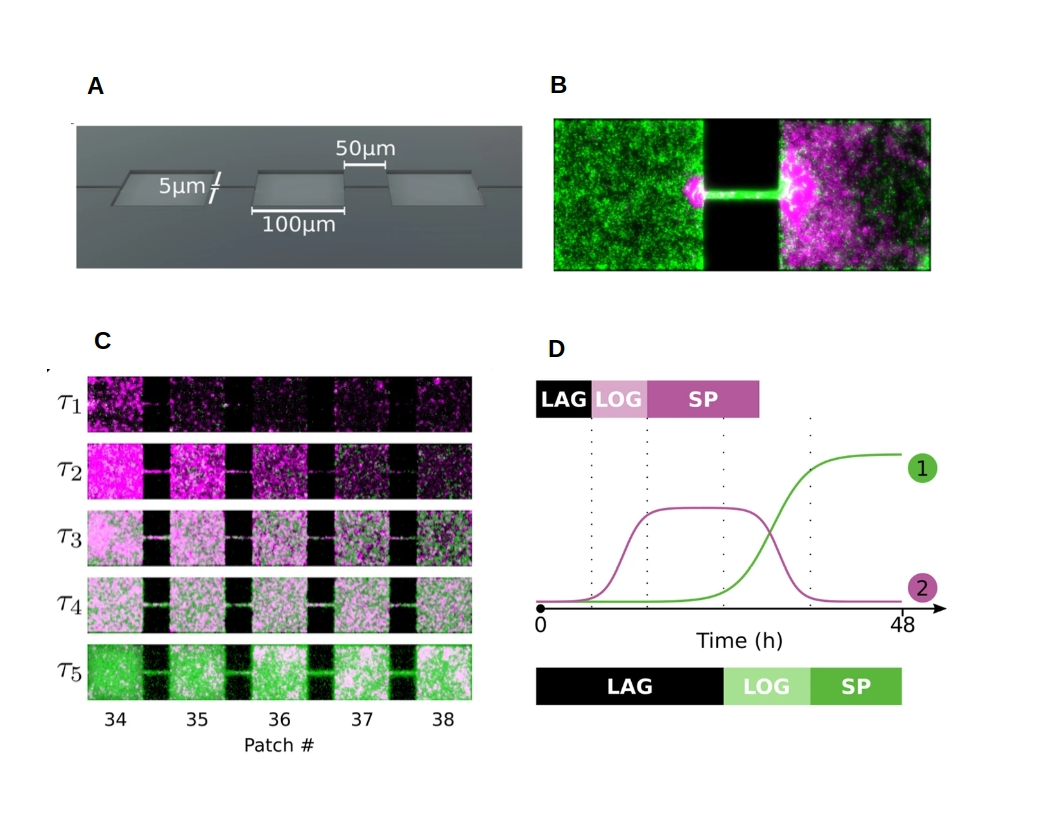
Ecological micro-succession and the competition-colonization trade-off in a bacterial meta-community on-chip. (A) sketch of a micron-scale structured bacterial environment based on microfluidics technology; (B) Fluorescent microscopy image of Escherichia coli (magenta) and Pseudomonas aeruginosa (green) inhabiting a device of the type depicted in A and which has been wettened with growth media and inoculated with both species; (C) a sequence of five snapshots of the bacterial community distributed over five patches (of an array with 85) depicting the spatial dynamics of competition between E. coli (magenta) and P. aeruginosa (green); (D) Representation of the succession pattern exhibited by the two bacterial species when competing for space and resources in a patchy environment.

In ecology, the competition–colonization trade-off is a stabilizing mechanism that has been proposed to explain species diversity in some biological systems, especially those that are not in equilibrium. In which case some species are particularly good at colonizing and others have well-established survival abilities. The concept of the competition-colonization trade-off was originally proposed by Levins and Culver, the model indicated that two species could coexist if one had impeccable competition skill and the other was excellent at colonizing. The model indicates that there is typically a trade-off, in which a species is typically better at either competing or colonizing. A later model, labelled The Lottery Model was also proposed, in which interspecific competition is accounted for within the population.

== Mathematical models ==
=== Levins and Culver model ===
$$\frac{\text{d} p_1}{\text{d} t} = c_1 p_1 (1 - p_1) - m_1 p_1$$
$$\frac{\text{d} p_2}{\text{d} t} = c_2 p_2 (1 - p_1 - p_2) - m_2 p_2 - c_1 p_1 p_2$$

Where: $p_i =$ fraction of patches that are occupied by species $i$;

$c_i =$ colonization rate of species $i$;

$m_i =$ mortality rate of species $i$ (independent of patch density).

Species 1 = competitor, can colonize in area that is uninhabited or inhabited by species 2 $(1 - p_1)$.

Species 2 = colonizer, can only colonize in uninhabited areas $(1 - p_1 - p_2)$.

Species 2 is subject to displacement by its competitor $(- c_1 p_1 p_2)$.

If species 2 has a higher colonization rate it can coexist with species 1: $c_2 > \frac{c_1(c_1+m_2-m_1)}{m_1}$.

This model is described as the displacement competition model, it has been observed in marine mollusks and fungi. This model makes two large assumptions: 1. "a propagule of a superior competitor takes over a patch from an adult of the inferior competitor". 2. The adult must be displaced fast enough to ensure that it does not reproduce while it is being displaced.

=== Lottery model ===
$$\frac{\text{d} p_1}{\text{d} t} = c_1 \frac{f}{f + p_2} p_1 (h - p_1 - p_2) - m_1 p_1$$
$$\frac{\text{d} p_2}{\text{d} t} = c_2 \frac{g}{g + p_1} p_2 (h - p_1 - p_2) - m_2 p_2$$

Colonization rate is now described by interspecific competition.

$\frac{f}{f + p_2}$ and $\frac{g}{g + p_1}$. Both f and g > 0.

An increase in p1 is related to a decrease in the colonization rate of species 2.

g < f implies a competitive advantage of species 1 and c2 > c1 implies a colonization advantage for species 2.

== In plants ==
The competition-colonization trade-off theory has primarily been used to examine and describe the dispersal-linked traits of a plant's seeds. Seed size is a primary feature that relates to a species ability to colonize or compete within a given population, the effect of seed size was displayed in dicotyledonous annual plants. Turnbull and colleagues indicated that the competition/colonization trade-off has a stabilizing effect on the population of plants.

== In algae ==
For example, in a classic study on an intertidal zone in Southern California, it was shown that when a boulder was overturned, it would quickly be colonized by green algae and barnacles (which were better colonizers). However, if left undisturbed, the boulders would eventually be overtaken by red algae (which was the stronger competitor in the long term).

== In bacteria ==
It has been shown experimentally that in a two-species artificial metacommunity of motile strains on-chip, bacteria Escherichia coli is a fugitive species, whereas Pseudomonas aeruginosa is a slower colonizer but superior competitor. The pattern of ecological succession driving dynamics of the metacommunity in a patchy habitat landscape is as follows: Starting with a pristine one-dimensional (array) archipelago of island habitats (patches) which is inoculated with E. coli and P. aeruginosa from opposite ends; locally E. coli colonizes first and later P. aeruginosa takes over while at the landscape scale E. coli persists as a fugitive species scrambling for patches.

== See also ==
- Intermediate disturbance hypothesis
