= Competitive exclusion principle =

Ecology proposition

1: A smaller (yellow) species of bird forages across the whole tree. 2: A larger (red) species competes for resources. 3: Red dominates in the middle for the more abundant resources. Yellow adapts to a new niche restricted to the top and bottom and avoiding competition.

In ecology, the competitive exclusion principle, sometimes referred to as Gause's law, is a proposition that two species which compete for the same limited resource cannot coexist at constant population sizes. When one species has even the slightest advantage over another, the one with the advantage will dominate in the long term. This leads either to the extinction of the weaker competitor or to an evolutionary or behavioral shift toward a different ecological niche. The principle has been paraphrased in the maxim "complete competitors cannot coexist".

== History ==
The competitive exclusion principle is classically attributed to Georgy Gause, although he actually never formulated it. The principle is already present in Darwin's theory of natural selection.

Throughout its history, the status of the principle has oscillated between a priori ('two species coexisting must have different niches') and experimental truth ('we find that species coexisting do have different niches').

== Experimental basis ==
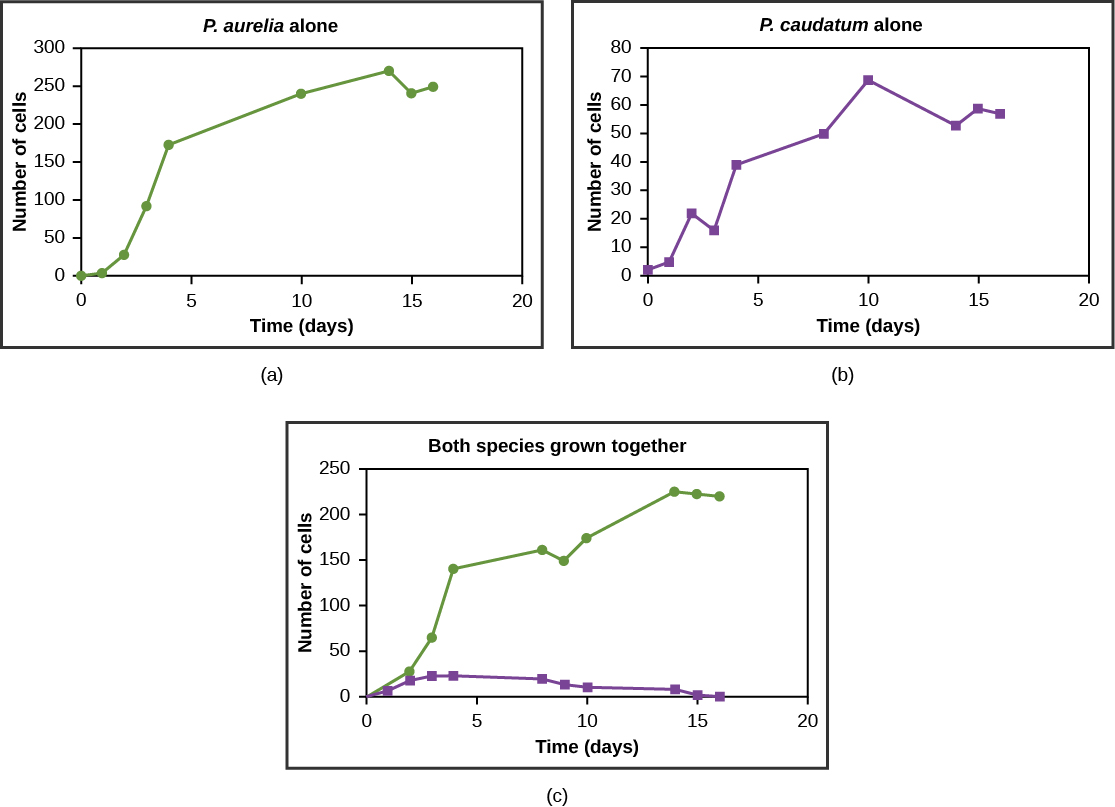
Paramecium aurelia and Paramecium caudatum grow well individually, but when they compete for the same resources, P. aurelia outcompetes P. caudatum.

Based on field observations, Joseph Grinnell formulated the principle of competitive exclusion in 1904: "Two species of approximately the same food habits are not likely to remain long evenly balanced in numbers in the same region. One will crowd out the other". Georgy Gause formulated the law of competitive exclusion based on laboratory competition experiments using two species of Paramecium, P. aurelia and P. caudatum. The conditions were to add fresh water every day and input a constant flow of food. Although P. caudatum initially dominated, P. aurelia recovered and subsequently drove P. caudatum extinct via exploitative resource competition. However, Gause was able to let the P. caudatum survive by differing the environmental parameters (food, water). Thus, Gause's law is valid only if the ecological factors are constant.

== Prediction ==
Cellular automaton model of interspecific competition for a single limited resource

Competitive exclusion is predicted by mathematical and theoretical models such as the Lotka–Volterra models of competition. However, for poorly understood reasons, competitive exclusion is rarely observed in natural ecosystems, and many biological communities appear to violate Gause's law. The best-known example is the so-called "paradox of the plankton". All plankton species live on a very limited number of resources, primarily solar energy and minerals dissolved in the water. According to the competitive exclusion principle, only a small number of plankton species should be able to coexist on these resources. Nevertheless, large numbers of plankton species coexist within small regions of open sea.

Some communities that appear to uphold the competitive exclusion principle are MacArthur's warblers and Darwin's finches, though the latter still overlap ecologically very strongly, being only affected negatively by competition under extreme conditions.

== Paradoxical traits ==
A partial solution to the paradox lies in raising the dimensionality of the system. Spatial heterogeneity, trophic interactions, multiple resource competition, competition-colonization trade-offs, and lag may prevent exclusion (ignoring stochastic extinction over longer time-frames). However, such systems tend to be analytically intractable. In addition, many can, in theory, support an unlimited number of species. A new paradox is created: Most well-known models that allow for stable coexistence allow for unlimited number of species to coexist, yet, in nature, any community contains just a handful of species.

== Redefinition ==
Recent studies addressing some of the assumptions made for the models predicting competitive exclusion have shown these assumptions need to be reconsidered. For example, a slight modification of the assumption of how growth and body size are related leads to a different conclusion, namely that, for a given ecosystem, a certain range of species may coexist while others become outcompeted.

One of the primary ways niche-sharing species can coexist is the competition-colonization trade-off. In other words, species that are better competitors will be specialists, whereas species that are better colonizers are more likely to be generalists. Host-parasite models are effective ways of examining this relationship, using host transfer events. There seem to be two places where the ability to colonize differs in ecologically closely related species. In feather lice, Bush and Clayton provided some verification of this by showing two closely related genera of lice are nearly equal in their ability to colonize new host pigeons once transferred. Harbison continued this line of thought by investigating whether the two genera differed in their ability to transfer. This research focused primarily on determining how colonization occurs and why wing lice are better colonizers than body lice. Vertical transfer is the most common occurrence, between parent and offspring, and is much-studied and well understood. Horizontal transfer is difficult to measure, but in lice seems to occur via phoresis or the "hitchhiking" of one species on another. Harbison found that body lice are less adept at phoresis and excel competitively, whereas wing lice excel in colonization.

Support for a model of competition-colonization trade-off is also found in small mammals related to fire disturbances. In a project focused on the long-term impacts of the 1988 Yellowstone Fires Allen et al. used stable isotopes and spatial mark-recapture data to show that Southern red-backed voles (Clethrionomys gapperi)), a specialist, are excluding deer mice (Peromyscus maniculatus), a generalist, from food resources in old-growth forests. However, after wildfire disturbance deer mice are more effective colonizers, and able to take advantage of the release from competitive pressure from voles. This dynamic establishes a pattern of ecological succession in these ecosystems, with competitive exclusion from voles shaping the amount and quality of resources deer mice can access.

== Phylogenetic context ==
An ecological community is the assembly of species which is maintained by ecological (Hutchinson, 1959; Leibold, 1988) and evolutionary process (Weiher and Keddy, 1995; Chase et al., 2003). These two processes play an important role in shaping the existing community and will continue in the future (Tofts et al., 2000; Ackerly, 2003; Reich et al., 2003). In a local community, the potential members are filtered first by environmental factors such as temperature or availability of required resources and then secondly by its ability to co-exist with other resident species.

In an approach of understanding how two species fit together in a community or how the whole community fits together, The Origin of Species (Darwin, 1859) proposed that under homogeneous environmental condition struggle for existence is greater between closely related species than distantly related species. He also hypothesized that the functional traits may be conserved across phylogenies. Such strong phylogenetic similarities among closely related species are known as phylogenetic effects (Derrickson et al., 1988.)

With field study and mathematical models, ecologists have pieced together a connection between functional traits similarity between species and its effect on species co-existence. According to competitive-relatedness hypothesis (Cahil et al., 2008) or phylogenetic limiting similarity hypothesis (Violle et al., 2011) interspecific competition is high among the species which have similar functional traits, and which compete for similar resources and habitats. Hence, it causes reduction in the number of closely related species and even distribution of it, known as phylogenetic overdispersion (Webb et al., 2002). The reverse of phylogenetic overdispersion is phylogenetic clustering in which case species with conserved functional traits are expected to co-occur due to environmental filtering (Weiher et al., 1995; Webb, 2000). In the study performed by Webb et al., 2000, they showed that a small-plots of Borneo forest contained closely related trees together. This suggests that closely related species share features that are favored by the specific environmental factors that differ among plots causing phylogenetic clustering.

For both phylogenetic patterns (phylogenetic overdispersion and phylogenetic clustering), the baseline assumption is that phylogenetically related species are also ecologically similar (H. Burns et al., 2011). There are no significant number of experiments answering to what degree the closely related species are also similar in niche. Due to that, both phylogenetic patterns are not easy to interpret. It's been shown that phylogenetic overdispersion may also result from convergence of distantly related species (Cavender-Bares et al. 2004; Kraft et al. 2007). In their study, they have shown that traits are convergent rather than conserved. While, in another study, it's been shown that phylogenetic clustering may also be due to historical or bio-geographical factors which prevents species from leaving their ancestral ranges. So, more phylogenetic experiments are required for understanding the strength of species interaction in community assembly.

== Application to humans ==
Evidence showing that the competitive exclusion principle operates in human groups has been reviewed and integrated into regality theory to explain warlike and peaceful societies. For example, hunter-gatherer groups surrounded by other hunter-gatherer groups in the same ecological niche will fight, at least occasionally, while hunter-gatherer groups surrounded by groups with a different means of subsistence can coexist peacefully.

Another recent application: in his work Historical Dynamics, Peter Turchin developed the so-called meta-ethnic frontier theory, wherein both rise and eventual fall of empires derives from geographically and or -politically colliding populations. Accordingly, boundary regions, in which the competitive exclusion principle applies, are supposed to be key to human ethnogenesis. Summarizing its more wide-ranging predictions all in one:

Asabiya is a concept from the writings of Ibn Khaldun which Turchin defines as “the capacity for collective action” of a society. The Metaethnic Frontier theory is meant to incorporate asabiya as a key factor in predicting the dynamics of imperial agrarian societies - how they grow, shrink, and begin. Turchin posits that multi-level selection can help us identify the dynamics of asabiya in groups. He follows by noting three ways in which the logic of multi-level selection can be relevant in understanding change in “collective solidarity”: intergroup conflict, population and resource constraints, and ethnic boundaries. For small groups, intergroup conflict can increase asabiya as people need to band together to survive as a group. Conversely (again for small groups), a large population with respect to available resources can decrease asabiya as individuals compete for limited resources. For larger groups, Turchin proposes that ethnic boundaries can influence how bands of small groups with moderate ethnic differences can band together against people who are even more “ethnically distanced” - more “Other”. In this process of small groups banding together against peoples more Other than themselves, they can form what Turchin calls a Metaethnic Frontier … Turchin notes that the ethnic boundary dynamic which generates asabiya in a large group (composed of smaller groups) is weak because as the size of the group grows larger, the central regions are less exposed to intergroup conflict and asabiya decreases, leading to greater internal division. Finally, Turchin notes that all three aforementioned possibilities occur at regions which constitute imperial and metaethnic frontiers (imperial and metaethnic frontiers often coincide, he notes). It is in these regions of intense dynamics where asabiya is forged which are most prone to ethnogenesis.

== See also ==
- Limiting factor
- Limiting similarity
- Paradox of the plankton
