= Ecological succession =

Change of species in a region over time

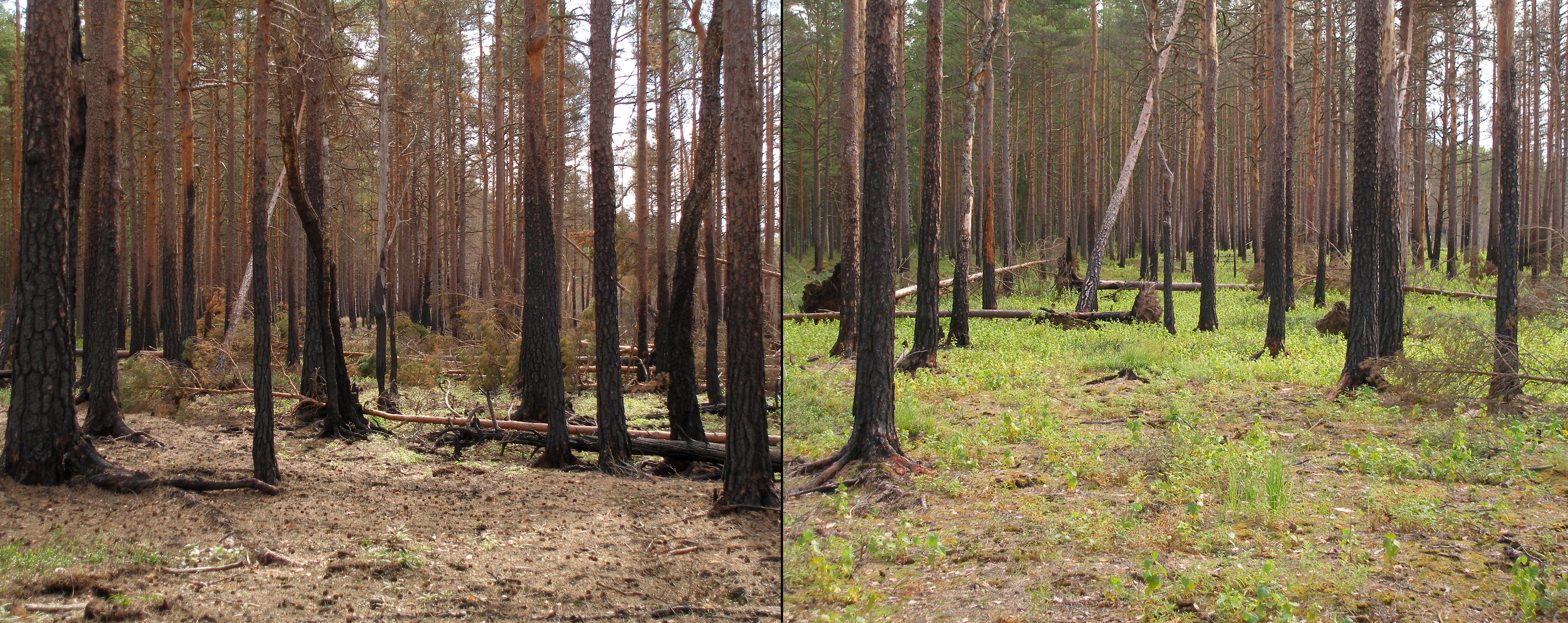
Secondary succession after disturbance: a boreal forest one year (left) and two years (right) after a wildfire.

Ecological succession is the process of how species compositions change in an ecological community over time.

The two main categories of ecological succession are primary succession and secondary succession. Primary succession occurs after the initial colonization of a newly created habitat with no living organisms. Secondary succession occurs after a disturbance such as fire, habitat destruction, or a natural disaster destroys a pre-existing community.

Both consistent patterns and variability are observed in ecological succession. Theories of ecological succession identify different factors that help explain why plant communities change the way they do.

Urban areas are characterized by high population density, with people living clustered communities and human built structures. Ecological succession looks different in these areas compared to a natural ecosystem. Analyzing succession is usually done using Clementsian's climax theory, but urban succession can be better understood by looking at these factors: site availability, differential species availability, and differential species performance.

Succession was among the first theories advanced in ecology. Ecological succession was first documented in the Indiana Dunes of Northwest Indiana by Henry Chandler Cowles during the late 19th century and remains a main ecological topic of study. Over time, the understanding of succession has changed to include a more complex cyclical model that argues organisms do not have fixed roles or relationships. Ecologists and conservationists have since used the theory of succession to aid in developing ecological restoration strategies.

== Stages of succession ==
=== Mechanisms ===
In 1916, Frederic Clements published a descriptive theory of succession and advanced it as a general ecological concept. The process of succession occurs over multiple stages.

1. Nudation refers to a bare area that has little to no life forms or organic matter. In secondary succession, nudation occurs after a disturbance.
2. Migration refers to arrival of propagules,any material such as a seed or spore move to a new enviorment.
3. Ecesis involves establishment and initial growth of vegetation.
4. Competition occurs as vegetation becomes well established, grows, and spreads, various species begin to compete for space, light and nutrients.
5. Reaction refers to the phase where autogenic changes such as the buildup of humus affect the habitat, and one plant community replaces another.
6. Stabilization occurs when a supposedly stable climax community forms.

=== Seral community ===
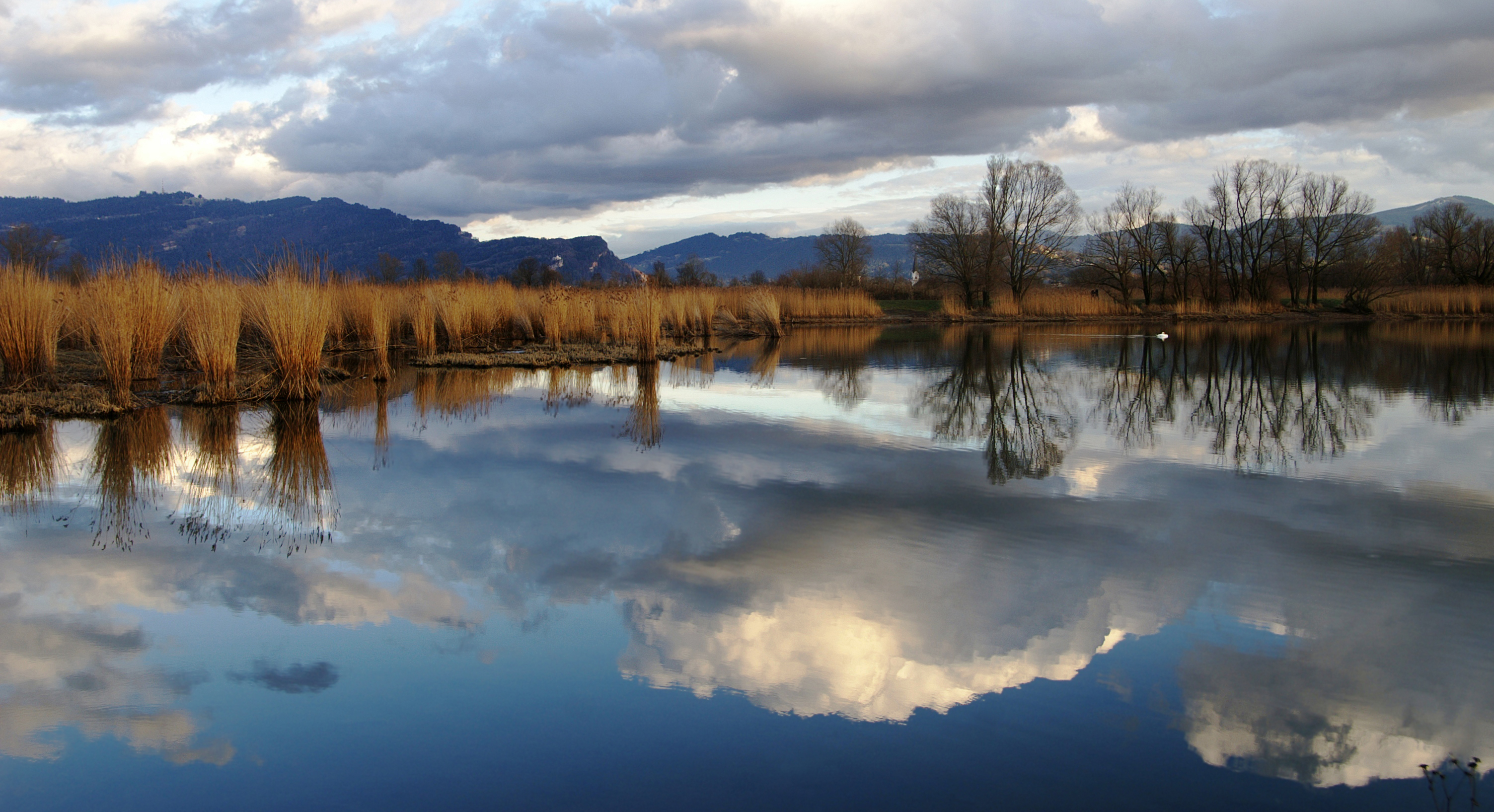
A hydrosere community

A seral community is an intermediate stage found in an ecosystem advancing towards its climax community. In many cases more than one seral stage evolves until climax conditions are attained. A prisere is a collection of seres making up the development of an area from non-vegetated surfaces to a climax community. Depending on the substratum and climate, different seres are found.

=== Climax community ===
According to classical ecological theory, succession stops when the sere has arrived at an equilibrium or steady state with the physical and biotic environment. Barring major disturbances, it will persist indefinitely. This end point of succession is called climax.

The final or stable community in a sere is the climax community or climatic vegetation. It is self-perpetuating and in equilibrium with the physical habitat. There is no net annual accumulation of organic matter in a climax community. The annual production and use of energy is balanced in such a community.

=== Characteristics ===
- vegetation is tolerant of environmental conditions.
- It has a wide diversity of species, a well-drained spatial structure, and complex food chains.
- The climax ecosystem is balanced. There is equilibrium between gross primary production and total respiration, between energy used from sunlight and energy released by decomposition, between uptake of nutrients from the soil and the return of nutrient by litter fall to the soil.
- Individuals in the climax stage are replaced by others of the same kind. Thus the species composition maintains equilibrium.
- It is an index of the climate of the area. The life or growth forms indicate the climatic type.

=== Types of climax ===
Climatic Climax
If there is only a single climax and the development of climax community is controlled by the climate of the region, it is termed as climatic climax. For example, the development of Maple-beech climax community over moist soil. Climatic climax is theoretical and develops where physical conditions of the substrate are not so extreme as to modify the effects of the prevailing regional climate.: Subclimax: The prolonged stage in succession just preceding the climatic climax is subclimax.
Edaphic Climax
When there are more than one climax communities in the region, modified by local conditions of the substrate such as soil moisture, soil nutrients, topography, slope exposure, fire, and animal activity, it is called edaphic climax. Succession ends in an edaphic climax where topography, soil, water, fire, or other disturbances are such that a climatic climax cannot develop.
Catastrophic Climax
Climax vegetation vulnerable to a catastrophic event such as a wildfire. For example, in California, chaparral vegetation is the final vegetation. The wildfire removes the mature vegetation and decomposers. A rapid development of herbaceous vegetation follows until the shrub dominance is re-established. This is known as catastrophic climax. The ecology of natural disturbance and patch dynamics.
Disclimax
When a stable community, which is not the climatic or edaphic climax for the given site, is maintained by man or his domestic animals, it is designated as Disclimax (disturbance climax) or anthropogenic subclimax (man-generated). For example, overgrazing by stock may produce a desert community of bushes and cacti where the local climate actually would allow grassland to maintain itself.
Preclimax and Postclimax
In certain areas different climax communities develop under similar climatic conditions. If the community has life forms lower than those in the expected climatic climax, it is called preclimax; a community that has life forms higher than those in the expected climatic climax is postclimax. Preclimax strips develop in less moist and hotter areas, whereas Postclimax strands develop in more moist and cooler areas than that of surrounding climate.

=== Theories ===
There are three schools of interpretations explaining the climax concept:

- Monoclimax or Climatic Climax Theory was advanced by Clements (1916) and recognizes only one climax whose characteristics are determined solely by climate (climatic climax). The processes of succession and modification of environment overcome the effects of differences in topography, parent material of the soil, and other factors. The whole area would be covered with uniform plant community. Communities other than the climax are related to it, and are recognized as subclimax, postclimax and disclimax.
- Polyclimax Theory was advanced by Tansley (1935). It proposes that the climax vegetation of a region consists of more than one vegetation climaxes controlled by soil moisture, soil nutrients, topography, slope exposure, fire, and animal activity.
- Climax Pattern Theory was proposed by Whittaker (1953). The climax pattern theory recognizes a variety of climaxes governed by responses of species populations to biotic and abiotic conditions. According to this theory the total environment of the ecosystem determines the composition, species structure, and balance of a climax community. The environment includes the species' responses to moisture, temperature, and nutrients, their biotic relationships, availability of flora and fauna to colonize the area, chance dispersal of seeds and animals, soils, climate, and disturbance such as fire and wind. The nature of climax vegetation will change as the environment changes. The climax community represents a pattern of populations that corresponds to and changes with the pattern of environment. The central and most widespread community is the climatic climax.

The theory of alternative stable states suggests there is not one end point but many which transition between each other over ecological time.

== Factors ==
=== Diversity of possible trajectories ===
Ecological succession was formerly seen as an orderly progression through distinct stages, where several plant communities would replace each other in a fixed order and eventually reach a stable end point known as the climax. The climax community was sometimes referred to as the 'potential vegetation' of a site, and thought to be primarily determined by the local climate. This idea has been largely abandoned by modern ecologists in favor of nonequilibrium ideas of ecosystems dynamics. Most natural ecosystems experience disturbance at a rate that makes a "climax" community unattainable. Climate change often occurs at a rate and frequency sufficient to prevent arrival at a climax state.

The trajectory of successional change can be influenced by initial site conditions, by the type of disturbance that triggers succession, by the interactions of the species present, and by more random factors such as availability of colonists or seeds or weather conditions at the time of disturbance. Some aspects of succession are broadly predictable; others may proceed more unpredictably than in the classical view of ecological succession. Coupled with the stochastic nature of disturbance events and other long-term (e.g., climatic) changes, such dynamics make it doubtful whether the 'climax' concept ever applies or is particularly useful in considering actual vegetation.

=== Stochastic events ===
Stotchastic events are succession is influenced partially by random chance, but it is debated how much random chance directs the trajectory of succession, as opposed to more deterministic factors. The timing of a disturbance such as a weather event may be random and unpredictable. Dispersal of propagules to a new site may also be random. However, community assembly is also determined by processes that select species non-randomly from the local species pool.

=== Dispersal limitation vs. environmental filtering ===
Succession is impacted both by the ability of seeds to disperse to new sites, and the suitability of site conditions for those seeds to grow and survive. Dispersal limitation means that even though favorable sites for a plant to live might exist, the plant's seeds may be unable to reach those sites. Environmental filtering, also called establishment limitation, implies that although seeds may be distributed to a site, those seeds may be unable to survive due to various characteristics of the site. The predicted impact of these two factors varies under different models of ecological succession.

=== Feedback loops ===
Ecological succession is driven by feedbacks between plants and their environment. As plants grow following a disturbance, they change their environment, for example by creating shade, attracting seed dispersers, contributing organic matter to the soil, changing the availability of soil nutrients, creating microhabitats, and buffering temperature and moisture fluctuations. This creates opportunities for different plants to grow, which causes directional change in the ecosystem. The development of some ecosystem attributes, such as soil properties and nutrient cycles, are both influenced by community properties, and, in turn, influence further successional development. This feed-back process may occur over a span of centuries or a millennia. Plants may facilitate the establishment of other plants by creating suitable conditions for them to grow, for example by providing shade or allowing for soil formation. Plants may also competitively exclude or otherwise prevent the growth of other plants.

=== Patterns ===
Though the idea of a fixed, predictable process of succession with a single well-defined climax is an overly simplified model, several predictions made by the classical model are accurate. Species diversity, overall plant biomass, plant lifespans, the importance of decomposer organisms, and overall stability all increase as a community approaches a climax state, while the rate at which soil nutrients are consumed, rate of biogeochemical cycling, and rate of net primary productivity all decrease as a community approaches a climax state.

Communities in early succession will be dominated by fast-growing, well-dispersed species (opportunist, fugitive, or r-selected life-histories). These are also called pioneer species. As succession proceeds, these species will tend to be replaced by more competitive (k-selected) species.

Some of these trends do not apply in all cases. For example, species diversity almost necessarily increases during early succession as new species arrive, but may decline in later succession as competition eliminates opportunistic species and leads to dominance by locally superior competitors. Net Primary Productivity, biomass, and trophic properties all show variable patterns over succession, depending on the particular system and site.

=== Disruptions ===
Two important perturbation factors today are human actions and climatic change. Additions to available species pools through range expansions and introductions can also continually reshape communities.

== Types of succession ==
=== Primary succession ===
The successional dynamics beginning with colonization of an area with little to no biotic factors is referred to as primary succession. This includes newly exposed rock or sand surfaces, lava flows, and newly exposed glacial tills. The stages of primary succession include pioneer species such as microorganisms, plants (lichens and mosses), grasses, smaller shrubs, and trees. Small animals move into the area when enough suitable habitat has been established. When it is a fully functioning ecosystem, it has reached the climax community stage.

=== Secondary succession ===
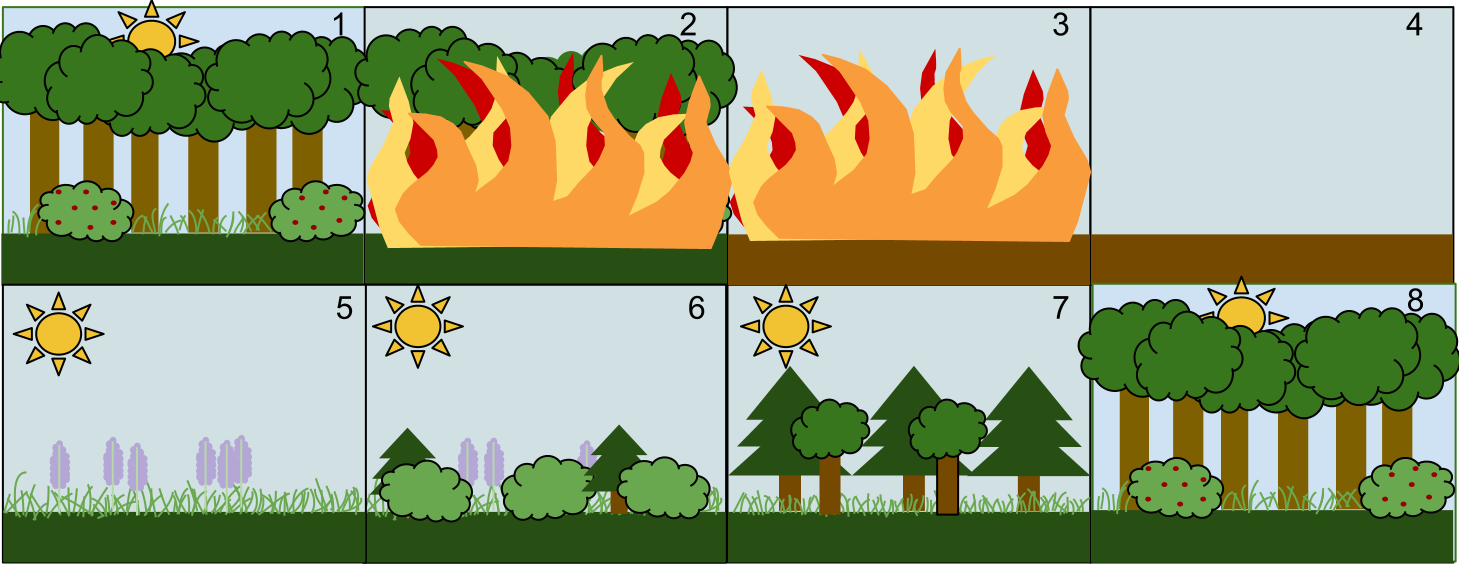
An example of secondary succession by stages: 1. A stable deciduous forest community; 2. A disturbance, such as a wild fire, destroys the forest; 3. The fire burns the forest to the ground; 4. The fire leaves behind empty, but not destroyed, soil; 5. Grasses and other herbaceous plants grow back first; 6. Small bushes and trees begin to colonize the area; 7. Fast-growing evergreen trees develop to their fullest, while shade-tolerant trees develop in the understory; 8. The short-lived and shade-intolerant evergreen trees die as the larger deciduous trees overtop them. The ecosystem is now back to a similar state to where it began.

Secondary succession follows severe disturbance or removal of a preexisting community that has remnants of the previous ecosystem. Secondary succession is strongly influenced by pre-disturbance conditions such as soil development, seed banks, remaining organic matter, and residual living organisms. Because of residual fertility and preexisting organisms, community change in early stages of secondary succession can be relatively rapid.

Secondary succession is much more commonly observed and studied than primary succession. Particularly common types of secondary succession include responses to natural disturbances such as fire, flood, and severe winds, and to human-caused disturbances such as logging and agriculture. In secondary succession, the soils and organisms need to be left unharmed so there is a way for the new material to rebuild.

As an example, in a fragmented old field habitat created in eastern Kansas, woody plants "colonized more rapidly (per unit area) on large and nearby patches".

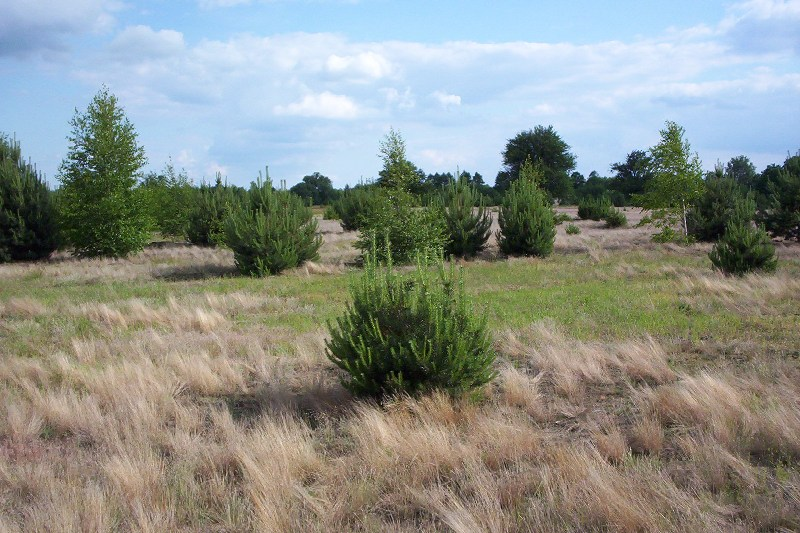
Secondary succession: trees are colonizing uncultivated fields and meadows.

Secondary succession can quickly change a landscape. In the 1900s, Acadia National Park had a wildfire that destroyed much of the landscape. Originally evergreen trees grew in the landscape. After the fire, the area took at least a year to grow shrubs. Eventually, deciduous trees started to grow instead of evergreens.

Secondary succession has been occurring in Shenandoah National Park following the 1995 flood of the Moorman's and Rapidan rivers, which destroyed plant and animal life.

=== Seasonal and cyclic dynamics ===
Unlike secondary succession, these types of vegetation change are not dependent on disturbance but are periodic changes arising from fluctuating species interactions or recurring events. These models modify the climax concept towards one of dynamic states.

=== Causes of plant succession ===
Autogenic succession can be brought by changes in the soil caused by the organisms there. These changes include accumulation of organic matter in litter or humic layer, alteration of soil nutrients, or change in the pH of soil due to the plants growing there. The structure of the plants themselves can also alter the community. For example, when larger species like trees mature, they produce shade on to the developing forest floor that tends to exclude light-requiring species. Shade-tolerant species will invade the area.

Allogenic succession is caused by external environmental influences and not by the vegetation. For example, soil changes due to erosion, leaching or the deposition of silt and clays can alter the nutrient content and water relationships in the ecosystems. Animals also play an important role in allogenic changes as they are pollinators, seed dispersers and herbivores. They can also increase nutrient content of the soil in certain areas, or shift soil about (as termites, ants, and moles do) creating patches in the habitat. This may create regeneration sites that favor certain species.

Climatic factors may be very important, but on a much longer time-scale than any other. Changes in temperature and rainfall patterns will promote changes in communities. As the climate warmed at the end of each ice age, great successional changes took place. The tundra vegetation and bare glacial till deposits underwent succession to mixed deciduous forest. The greenhouse effect resulting in increase in temperature is likely to bring profound Allogenic changes in the next century. Geological and climatic catastrophes such as volcanic eruptions, earthquakes, avalanches, meteors, floods, fires, and high wind also bring allogenic changes.

== Changes in animal life ==
Succession theory was developed primarily by botanists. The study of succession applied to whole ecosystems initiated in the writings of Ramon Margalef, while Eugene Odum's publication of The Strategy of Ecosystem Development is considered its formal starting point.

Animal life also exhibits changes with changing communities. In the lichen stage, fauna is sparse. It comprises a few mites, ants, and spiders living in cracks and crevices. The fauna undergoes a qualitative increase during the herb grass stage. The animals found during this stage include nematodes, insect larvae, ants, spiders, mites, etc. The animal population increases and diversifies with the development of the forest climax community. The fauna consists of invertebrates like slugs, snails, worms, millipedes, centipedes, ants, bugs; and vertebrates such as squirrels, foxes, mice, moles, snakes, various birds, salamanders and frogs.

A review of succession research by Hodkinson et al. (2002) documented what was likely first noted by Darwin during his voyage on the H.M.S. Beagle:

The often repeated description of the stately palm and other nobel plants, then birds, and lastly man, taking possession of the coral islets as soon as formed in the Pacific, is probably not quite correct; I fear it destroys the poetry of this story, that feather and dirt-feeding and parasitic insects and spiders should be the first inhabitants of newly-formed oceanic land.

— C. Darwin

These naturalists note that prior to the establishment of autotrophs, there is a foodweb formed by heterotrophs built on allochthonous inputs of dead organic matter (necromass). Work on volcanic systems such as Kasatochi Volcano in the Aleutians by Sikes and Slowik (2010) supports this idea.

== Microsuccession ==
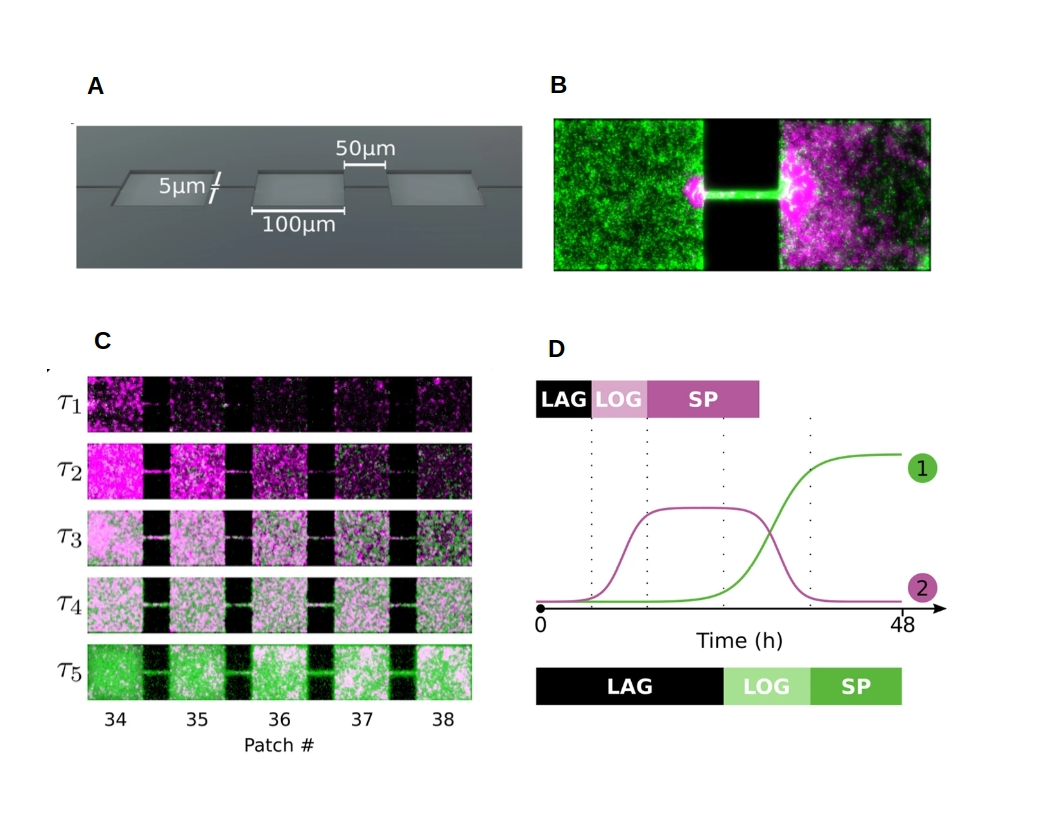
Ecological micro-succession in a bacterial meta-community on-chip. (A) sketch of a micron-scale structured bacterial environment based on microfluidics technology; (B) Fluorescent microscopy image of Escherichia coli (magenta) and Pseudomonas aeruginosa (green) inhabiting a device of the type depicted in A and which has been wettened with growth media and inoculated with both species; (C) a sequence of five snapshots of the bacterial community distributed over five patches (of an array with 85) depicting the spatial dynamics of competition between E. coli (magenta) and P. aeruginosa (green); (D) Representation of the succession pattern exhibited by the two bacterial species when competing for space and resources in a patchy environment.

Succession of micro-organisms including fungi and bacteria occurring within a microhabitat is known as microsuccession or serule. In artificial bacterial meta-communities of motile strains on-chip it has been shown that ecological succession is based on a trade-off between colonization and competition abilities. To exploit locations or explore the landscape? Escherichia coli is a fugitive species, whereas Pseudomonas aeruginosa is a slower colonizer but superior competitor. Like in plants, microbial succession can occur in newly available habitats (primary succession) such as surfaces of plant leaves, recently exposed rock surfaces (i.e., glacial till) or animal infant guts, and also on disturbed communities (secondary succession) like those growing in recently dead trees, decaying fruits, or animal droppings. Microbial communities may also change due to products secreted by the bacteria present. Changes of pH in a habitat could provide ideal conditions for a new species to inhabit the area. In some cases the new species may outcompete the present ones for nutrients leading to the primary species demise. Changes can also occur by microbial succession with variations in water availability and temperature. Theories of macroecology have only recently been applied to microbiology and so much remains to be understood about this growing field. A recent study of microbial succession evaluated the balances between stochastic and deterministic processes in the bacterial colonization of a salt marsh chronosequence. The results of this study show that, much like in macro succession, early colonization (primary succession) is mostly influenced by stochasticity while secondary succession of these bacterial communities was more strongly influenced by deterministic factors.

== Urban Succession ==
=== Urbanization ===
Urban expansion occurs when cities grow and spread into its surrounding rural areas. Rapid urbanization causes threatening factors to ecosystems like habitat loss, mating limitations, foreign pollutants (air, water, land), and many more. These result from common urban changes consisting of factory establishment, habitat separation, as well as habitat destruction. Effects of urbanization are frequently irreversible and drastically decrease the biodiversity within the invaded areas.

Prime examples of highly urbanized areas include China, India, and Africa. These locations possess immense land masses, contributing to their large economic and population growth. China had a quicker expansion rate in coastal communities than their Western counterparts. Costal areas are highly effected by urbanization because of their high ecosystem vulnerability to rapid changes.

=== Casual Hierarchy Framework ===
Urban succession is analyzed using Pickett et al. (1987) three-tier Hierarchy of Successional Causes. The highest level highlights the general causes of succession. There are three conditions required for succession to take place: site availability, differential species availability, and differential species performance. The intermediate level explains the underlying causes of the three conditions. Site availability is caused by large scale disturbances such as fires, floods, or clearing land. Differential species availability is caused by dispersal dynamics and species that have survived disturbance. Differential species performance is caused by biological and environmental factors. The lowest level is more detailed and examines the measurements of those variables.

Site availability is an uncolonized area where new plants can grow. It is created by disturbances that disrupt an existing ecosystem, either on a large scale or a fine scale. It is measured by the impact on existing plants, the shape and size of the disturbance, and the frequency with which disturbances happen.

Differential species availability describes which plant species are able to colonize an open site. To meet these conditions, they must have a way of traveling there, or they are survivors of the disturbance and can regenerate their population. This is measured by analyzing what the transport vectors are, the landscape around the seed, and the time that has passed since the site opened.

Differential species performance is how well a species can grow, survive, and reproduce with others under the same environments. Pickett et al. (1987) break this down into seven ecological processes: resource availability, ecophysiology, life history strategy, stochastic environmental stress, competition, allelopathy, herbivory, disease, and predation. Performance is determined by measuring quantifiable variables in the environment, such as soil chemistry, light availability, predation rates, etc.

== Succession by habitat type ==
=== Forest succession ===
Aquatic succession or hydrosere: A) Emergent plant life, or pond pioneers, surround an open water lake. Some terrestrial plant life surrounds it as well. B) Emergent plant life begins to move inward and submerge, filling up the lake. Sediment accumulates as the plants grow and die. Terrestrial plant life increases. C) Sediment fills the lake basin, leaving a swampy center at the surface. Terrestrial plants take over and begin to slowly dry out the damp surface.

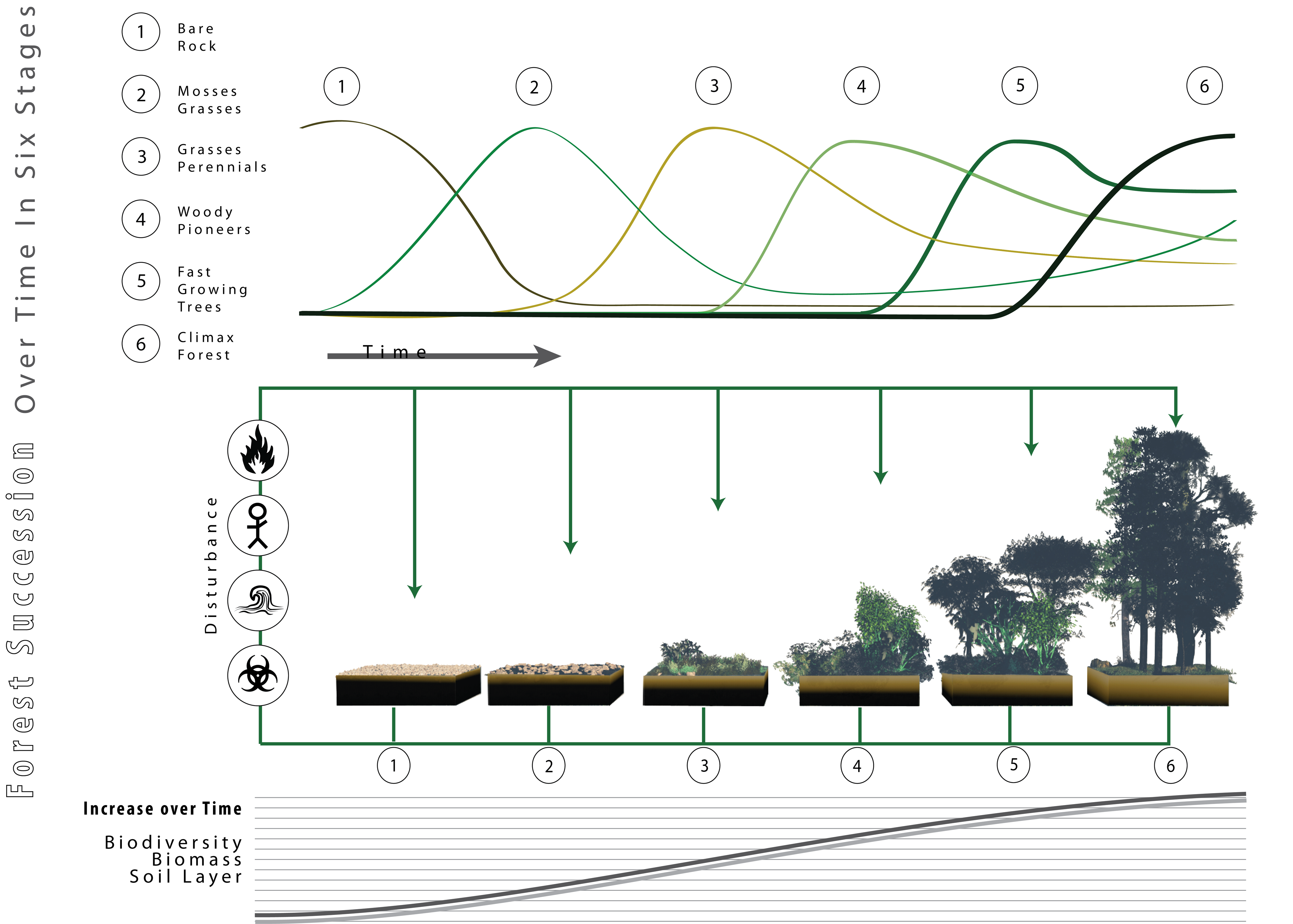

Forests, being an ecological system, are subject to the species succession process. There are "opportunistic" or "pioneer" species that produce great quantities of seed that are disseminated by the wind, and therefore can colonize big empty extensions. They are capable of germinating and growing in direct sunlight. Once they have produced a closed canopy, the lack of direct sun radiation at the soil makes it difficult for their own seedlings to develop. It is then the opportunity for shade-tolerant species to become established under the protection of the pioneers. When the pioneers die, the shade-tolerant species replace them. These species are capable of growing beneath the canopy, and therefore, in the absence of disturbances, will stay. For this reason it is then said the stand has reached its climax. When a disturbance occurs, the opportunity for the pioneers opens up again, provided they are present or within a reasonable range.

An example of pioneer species, in forests of northeastern North America are Betula papyrifera (White birch) and Prunus serotina (Black cherry), that are particularly well-adapted to exploit large gaps in forest canopies, but are intolerant of shade and are eventually replaced by other shade-tolerant species in the absence of disturbances that create such gaps. In the tropics, well known pioneer forest species can be found among the genera Cecropia, Ochroma and Trema.

Things in nature are not black and white, and there are intermediate stages. It is therefore normal that between the two extremes of light and shade there is a gradient, and there are species that may act as pioneer or tolerant, depending on the circumstances. It is of paramount importance to know the tolerance of species in order to practice an effective silviculture.

=== Wetland succession ===
Since many types of wetland environments exist, succession may follow a wide array of trajectories and patterns in wetlands. Under the classical model, the process of secondary succession holds that a wetland progresses over time from an initial state of open water with few plants, to a forested climax state where decayed organic matter has built up over time, forming peat. However, many wetlands are maintained by regular disturbance or natural processes at an equilibrium state that does not resemble the predicted forested "climax." The idea that ponds and wetlands gradually fill in to become dry land has been criticized and called into question due to lack of evidence.

Wetland succession is a uniquely complex, non-linear process shaped by hydrology. Hydrological factors often work against linear processes that predict a succession to a "climax" state. The energy carried by moving water may create a continuous source of disturbance. For example, in coastal wetlands, the tides moving in and out continuously acts upon the ecological community. Fire may also maintain an equilibrium state in a wetland by burning off vegetation, thus interrupting the accumulation of peat. Water entering and leaving the wetland follows patterns that are broadly cyclical but erratic. For example, seasonal flooding and drying may occur with yearly changes in precipitation, causing seasonal changes in the wetland community that maintain it at a stable state. However, unusually heavy rain or unusually severe drought may cause the wetland to enter a positive feedback loop where it begins to change in a linear direction. Since wetlands are sensitive to changes in the natural processes that maintain them, human activities, invasive species, and climate change could initiate long-term changes in wetland ecosystems.

=== Grassland succession ===
For a long time, grasslands were thought to be early stages of succession, dominated by weedy species and with little conservation value. However, comparing grasslands that form after recovery from long-term disruptions like agricultural tillage with ancient or "old-growth" grasslands has shown that grasslands are not inherently early-successional communities. Rather, grasslands undergo a centuries-long process of succession, and a grassland that is tilled up for agriculture or otherwise destroyed is estimated to take a minimum of 100 years, and potentially on average 1,400 years, to recover to its previous level of biodiversity. However, planting a high diversity of late-successional grassland species in a disturbed environment can accelerate the recovery of the soil's ability to sequester carbon, resulting in twice as much carbon storage as a naturally recovering grassland over the same period of time.

Many grassland ecosystems are maintained by disturbance, such as fire and grazing by large animals, or else the process of succession will change them to forest or shrubland. In fact, it is debated whether fire should be considered disturbance at all for the North American prairie ecosystems, since it maintains, rather than disrupts, an equilibrium state. Many late-successional grassland species have adaptations that allow them to store nutrients underground and re-sprout rapidly after "aboveground" disturbances like fire or grazing. Disturbance events that severely disrupt or destroy the soil, such as tilling, eliminate these late-successional species, reverting the grassland to an early successional stage dominated by pioneers, whereas fire and grazing benefit late-successional species. Both too much and too little disturbance can damage the biodiversity of disturbance-dependent ecosystems like grasslands.

In North American semi-arid grasslands, the introduction of livestock ranching and absence of fire was observed to cause a transition away from grasses to woody vegetation, particularly mesquite. However, the means by which ecological succession under frequent disturbance results in ecosystems of the sort seen in remnant prairies is poorly understood.

== History ==
Ecological succession is one of the first concepts that emerged within the study of ecology. Precursors of the idea of ecological succession go back to the beginning of the 19th century. As early as 1742 French naturalist Buffon noted that poplars precede oaks and beeches in the natural evolution of a forest. Buffon was later forced by the theological committee at the University of Paris to recant many of his ideas because they contradicted the biblical narrative of Creation.

Swiss geologist Jean-André Deluc and the later French naturalist Adolphe Dureau de la Malle were the first to make use of the word succession concerning the vegetation development after forest clear-cutting. In 1859 Henry David Thoreau wrote an address called "The Succession of Forest Trees" in which he described succession in an oak-pine forest. "It has long been known to observers that squirrels bury nuts in the ground, but I am not aware that any one has thus accounted for the regular succession of forests." The Austrian botanist Anton Kerner published a study about the succession of plants in the Danube river basin in 1863.

Ragnar Hult's 1885 study on the stages of forest development in Blekinge noted that grassland becomes heath before the heath develops into forest. Birch dominated the early stages of forest development, then pine (on dry soil) and spruce (on wet soil). If the birch is replaced by oak it eventually develops to beechwood. Swamps proceed from moss to sedges to moor vegetation followed by birch and finally spruce.

=== H. C. Cowles ===
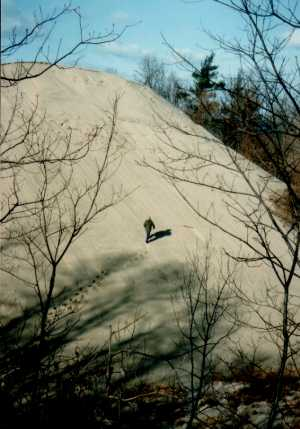
The Indiana Dunes on Lake Michigan, which stimulated Cowles' development of his theories of ecological succession

Between 1899 and 1910, Henry Chandler Cowles, at the University of Chicago, developed a more formal concept of succession. Inspired by studies of Danish dunes by Eugen Warming, Cowles studied vegetation development on sand dunes on the shores of Lake Michigan (the Indiana Dunes). He recognized that vegetation on dunes of different ages might be interpreted as different stages of a general trend of vegetation development on dunes (an approach to the study of vegetation change later termed space-for-time substitution, or chronosequence studies). He first published this work as a paper in the Botanical Gazette in 1899 ("The ecological relations of the vegetation of the sand dunes of Lake Michigan"). In this classic publication and subsequent papers, he formulated the idea of primary succession and the notion of a sere—a repeatable sequence of community changes specific to particular environmental circumstances.

=== Gleason and Clements ===
From about 1900 to 1960, however, understanding of succession was dominated by the theories of Frederic Clements, a contemporary of Cowles, who held that seres were highly predictable and deterministic and converged on a climatically determined stable climax community regardless of starting conditions. Clements explicitly analogized the successional development of ecological communities with ontogenetic development of individual organisms, and his model is often referred to as the pseudo-organismic theory of community ecology. Clements and his followers developed a complex taxonomy of communities and successional pathways.

Henry Gleason offered a contrasting framework as early as the 1920s. The Gleasonian model was more complex and much less deterministic than the Clementsian. It differs most fundamentally from the Clementsian view in suggesting a much greater role of chance factors and in denying the existence of coherent, sharply bounded community types. Gleason argued that species distributions responded individualistically to environmental factors, and communities were best regarded as artifacts of the juxtaposition of species distributions. Gleason's ideas, first published in 1926, were largely ignored until the late 1950s.

Two quotes illustrate the contrasting views of Clements and Gleason. Clements wrote in 1916:

The developmental study of vegetation necessarily rests upon the assumption that the unit or climax formation is an organic entity. As an organism the formation arises, grows, matures, and dies. Furthermore, each climax formation is able to reproduce itself, repeating with essential fidelity the stages of its development.

— Frederic Clements

while Gleason, in his 1926 paper, said:

An association is not an organism, scarcely even a vegetational unit, but merely a coincidence.

— Henry Gleason

Gleason's ideas were, in fact, more consistent with Cowles' original thinking about succession. About Clements' distinction between primary succession and secondary succession, Cowles wrote (1911):

This classification seems not to be of fundamental value, since it separates such closely related phenomena as those of erosion and deposition, and it places together such unlike things as human agencies and the subsidence of land.

— Henry Cowles

=== Eugene Odum ===
In 1969, Eugene Odum published The Strategy of Ecosystem Development, a paper that was highly influential to conservation and environmental restoration. Odum argued that ecological succession was an orderly progression toward a climax state where "maximum biomass and symbiotic function between organisms are maintained per unit energy flow." Odum highlighted how succession was not merely a change in the species composition of an ecosystem, but also created change in more complex attributes of the ecosystem, such as structure and nutrient cycling.

=== Modern era ===
A more rigorous, data-driven testing of successional models and community theory generally began with the work of Robert Whittaker and John Curtis in the 1950s and 1960s. Succession theory has since become less monolithic and more complex. J. Connell and R. Slatyer attempted a codification of successional processes by mechanism. Among British and North American ecologists, the notion of a stable climax vegetation has been largely abandoned, and successional processes have come to be seen as much less deterministic, with important roles for historical contingency and for alternate pathways in the actual development of communities. Debates continue as to the general predictability of successional dynamics and the relative importance of equilibrial vs. non-equilibrial processes. Former Harvard professor Fakhri A. Bazzaz introduced the notion of scale into the discussion, as he considered that at local or small area scale the processes are stochastic and patchy, but taking bigger regional areas into consideration, certain tendencies can not be denied.

More recent definitions of succession highlight change as the central characteristic. New research techniques are greatly enhancing contemporary scientists' ability to study succession, which is now seen as neither entirely random nor entirely predictable.

== See also ==
- Connell–Slatyer model of ecological succession
- Cyclic succession
- Ecological stability
- Intermediate disturbance hypothesis
