= Connell–Slatyer model of ecological succession =

Ecological succession can be understood as a process of changing species composition within a community due to an ecological disturbance, and varies largely according to the initial disturbance prompting the succession. Joseph Connell and Ralph Slatyer further developed the understanding of successional mechanisms in their 1977 paper and proposed that there were 3 main modes of successional development. These sequences could be understood in the context of the specific life-history theories of the individual species within an ecological community.

== The 1977 study ==
Connell and Slatyer chose to focus on autogenic succession, which occurs on newly exposed landforms and is initiated by changes from within the community rather than a geophysical transformation. They targeted plant and immobile aquatic organisms that demanded the greatest surface area within an environment and could modify the physical landscape. They defined community as "the set of organisms that occur together and that significantly affect each other's distribution and abundance".

== The models ==
The key factor distinguishing the three models is how the process of succession affects the original, pioneer species (i.e. their relative success in later-successional stages).

=== Facilitation model ===
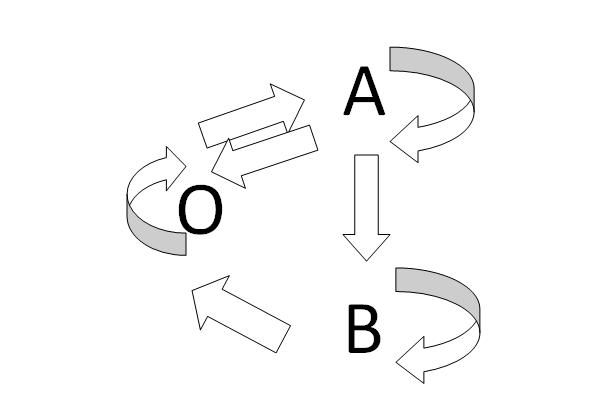
Facilitation Model

Based on the assumption that only particular species with qualities ideal for "early succession" can colonize the newly exposed landforms after an ecological disturbance.

- These "colonizing" qualities include: highly effective methods of dispersal, the ability to remain dormant for long periods of time, and a rapid growth rate. However, the pioneer species are often subsequently less successful once an area has been heavily populated by surrounding species due to increased shade, litter or concentrated roots in the soil, etc.
- Thus, the presence of early successional species often changes the environment so that the habitat is less hospitable for the original species’ own ecological demands and facilitates the invasion of later-successional species. (Note: See Ecological Facilitation.)

=== Tolerance model ===
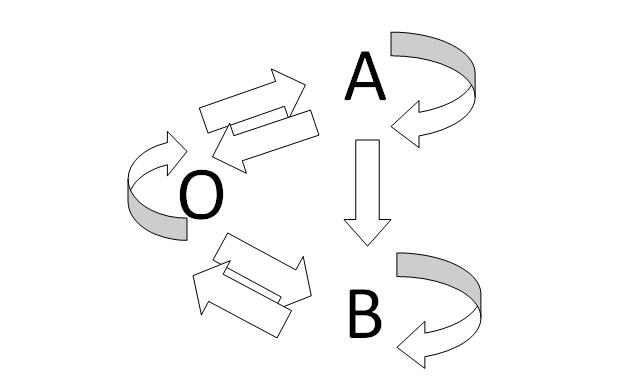
Tolerance Model

In this case, new pioneer species neither inhibit nor facilitate the growth and success of other species. The sequences of succession are thus entirely dependent on life-history characteristics such as the specific amount of energy a species allocates to growth.

- The climax community is composed of the most "tolerant" species that can co-exist with other species in a more densely populated area. Eventually, dominant species replace or reduce pioneer species abundance through competition.

=== Inhibition model ===
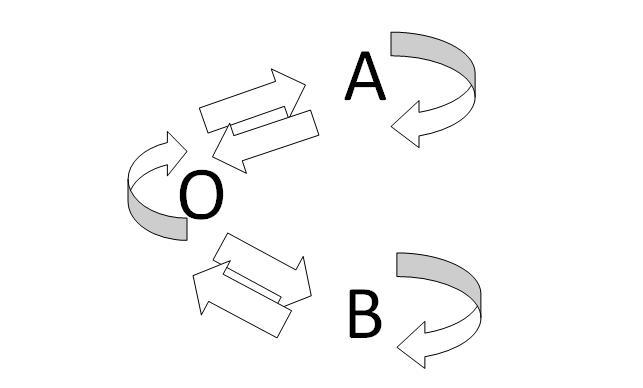
Inhibition Model

Earlier successional species actually inhibit growth of later successional species and reduce growth of colonizing species already present.

- Example: Pioneer species might modify the environment through rapid growth and make the area increasingly shady (essentially increasing competition for light).

- The environment is thus less hospitable to other potential colonizing species.

- The only possibility for new growth/colonization in this successional sequence arises when a disturbance leads to dominating species being destroyed, damaged, or removed. This frees up resources and allows for the invasion of other species that were not previously present.

== Examples of each model ==
1. Facilitation Model

Essentially, the facilitation model suggests that the presence of an initial species aids and increases the probability of the growth of a second species. For example, in "Physiological Controls Over Seedling Growth in Primary Succession on an Alaskan Floodplain" by Lawrence R. Walker and F. Stuart Chapin, III, the presence of alder plants aids the growth of willow and poplar seedlings in an Alaskan floodplain.

Alder roots contain nitrogen-fixing bacteria, which greatly increase the amount of inorganic nitrogen present in soils. This increased availability of nitrogen aids the growth of both willow and poplar seedlings in areas without other competition. Eventually, however, willow and poplar grow more rapidly than alder, leading to a reduction in the abundance of the pioneer species, and eventually, spruce becomes a later-succession species, due to its increased ability (over alder) to grow in shaded areas.

Another case of facilitation comes from the colonization of lakeshore sand dunes. Adjacent pioneer plants colonize the otherwise moving sands and alter the environmental constraints of the sandy environment to better suit other plant species, which can then allow for soil binding to take place. The giant saguaro cactus, in this respect, can only survive in the shade of other plants (or in some cases rocks) – pioneer species facilitate their existence by providing shade. (The argument has also been made that this type of interaction is exemplary of the tolerance model; see below).

2. Tolerance Model

The tolerance model is completely dependent upon life history characteristics. Each species has an equally likely chance to establish itself in the early stages of succession and their establishment results in no environmental changes or impacts on other species. Eventually, early species, typically dominated by r-selected species, which prioritize fast rates of reproduction, are out-competed by K-selected species (species that become more dominant when there is competition for limited resources).

For example, we can examine succession in the Loess Plateau in China. In the graph on page 995 of the paper "Plant Traits and Soil Chemical Variables During a Secondary Vegetation Succession in Abandoned Fields on the Loess Plateau" by Wang (2002), we can see the initial dominance of the Artemisia scoparia, the pioneer species. Over time, however, the Bothriochloa ischaemum becomes the dominant species and the abundance of A. scoparia greatly declines. This is due to the rapid rate of reproduction of the A. scoparia, resulting in the species' early abundance, and the dominant competition from the K-selected B. ischaemum, resulting in that species' later abundance.

A characteristic that is often associated with the tolerance model and well documented in forest succession is survival in conditions of shade. As an uninhabited area becomes populated by different plant species, shade increases – which makes less light available for the next generation. Species that are better adapted to shady conditions will then become dominant. All of the early species inhabiting the terrain have modified the environment in a way that favors a specific k-selected characteristic.

3. Inhibition Model

In this model, one species inhibits the presence of another, either through direct means, such as predation (by eating the other species or attacking them), or indirect means, such as competition for resources.

Sometimes in inhibition models, the time of establishment of a species determines which species becomes dominant. This phenomenon is referred to as the priority effect and suggests that the species that became established earlier are more likely to become the dominant species. One example of the inhibition model, and the priority effect, occurs in South Australia. In areas where bryozoans are established first, tunicates and sponges cannot grow.

The inhibition model has also been observed at work in forest ecosystems; in these systems the early arrivers hold a monopoly on the land, keeping other species out. Closed shrub canopies have been known to prevent tree growth and access to land for periods of up to 45 years – in an experimental study on inhibition it was found that areas occupied by large areas of Lantana sprawling shrubs excluded and inhibited the growth of tree species.

== Works cited ==
- Connell, Joseph H. and Ralph O. Slatyer. “Mechanisms of succession in natural communities and their role in community stability and organization.” The American Naturalist 111 (982) (Nov. - Dec. 1977): 1119-1144.
- Moorcroft, Paul. “Terrestrial Succession.” Organismic and Evolutionary Biology 55. Maxwell Dworkin, Cambridge. 4 April 2011.
- Ricklefs, Robert E. The Economy of Nature. (New York, NY: W.H. Freeman and Co., 2008).
- “Sand Dunes.” National Biological Information Infrastructure- Home. Accessed 29 Apr. 2011. <https://web.archive.org/web/20110727031615/http://www.nbii.gov/portal/server.pt/community/sand_dunes/1311>.
- Walker, Lawrence R. and F. Stuart Chapin, III. “Physiological Controls Over Seedling Growth in Primary Succession on an Alaskan Floodplain.” Ecology 67 (6) (Dec.,1986): 1508-1523.
- Walker, et al., “The Role of Life History Processes in Primary Succession on an Alaskan Floodplain,” 1243-1253.
- Wang, Guo-Hong. “Plant Traits and Soil Chemical Variables During a Secondary Vegetation Succession in Abandoned Fields on the Loess Plateau.” Acta Botanica Sinica 44 (8) (2002): 990-998.
