= Slatyer =

Slatyer is a surname. Notable people with the surname include:

- Ralph Slatyer (1929–2012), Australian ecologist
- Thea Slatyer (born 1983), Australian footballer
- Tracy Slatyer, Australian professor

== See also ==
- Connell–Slatyer model of ecological succession
