= Chronosequence =

Ecological sites of different ages

A chronosequence describes a set of ecological sites that share similar attributes but represent different ages.

A common assumption in establishing chronosequences is that no other variable besides age (such as various abiotic components and biotic components) has changed between sites of interest. Because this assumption cannot always be tested for environmental study sites, the use of chronosequences in field successional studies has recently been debated.

== Applications ==
=== Forest sciences ===
Since many processes in forest ecology take a long time (decades or centuries) to develop, chronosequence methods are used to represent and study the time-dependent development of a forest. Field data from a forest chronosequence can be collected in a short period of several months.

=== Soil science ===
Chronosequences used in soil studies consist of sites that have developed over different periods of time with relatively small differences in other soil-forming factors. Such groups of sites are used to assess the influence of time as a factor in pedogenesis.

=== Ecology ===
Chronosequences are often used to study the changes in plant communities during succession. A classic example of using chronosequences to study ecological succession is in the study of plant and microbial succession in recently deglaciated zones. For example, a study from 2005 used the distance from the nose of a glacier as a proxy for site age.
