= Soil seed bank =

Viable seed present in the soil

The soil seed bank is the natural storage of seeds, often dormant, within the soil of most ecosystems. The study of soil seed banks started in 1859 when Charles Darwin observed the emergence of seedlings using soil samples from the bottom of a lake. The first scientific paper on the subject was published in 1882 and reported on the occurrence of seeds at different soil depths. Weed seed banks have been studied intensely in agricultural science because of their important economic impacts; other fields interested in soil seed banks include forest regeneration and restoration ecology.

== The ecological importance of seed bank ==
The seed bank is one of the key factors for the persistence and density fluctuations of plant populations, especially for annual plants. Perennial plants have vegetative propagules to facilitate forming new plants, migration into new ground, or reestablishment after being top-killed, which are analogous to seed bank in their persistence ability under disturbance. These propagules are collectively called the 'soil bud bank', and include dormant and adventitious buds on stolons, rhizomes, and bulbs. Moreover, the term soil diaspore bank can be used to include non-flowering plants such as ferns and bryophytes.

Soil seed bank is significant breeding source for vegetation restoration and species-rich vegetation restoration, as they provide memories of past vegetation and represent the structure of future population. Moreover the composition of seed bank is often more stable than the vegetation to environmental changes, although a chronic N deposition can deplete it. In many systems, the density of the soil seed bank is often lower than the vegetation, and there are a large differences in species composition of the seed bank and the composition of the aboveground vegetation. Additionally, it is a key point that the relationship between soil seed bank and original potential to measure the revegetation potential. In endangered habitats, such as mudflats, rare and critically endangered species may be present in high densities, the composition of the seed bank is often more stable than the vegetation to environmental changes.

Soil seed banks are a crucial part of the rapid re-vegetation of sites disturbed by wildfire, catastrophic weather, agricultural operations, and timber harvesting, a natural process known as secondary succession. Soil seed banks are often dominated by pioneer species, those species that are specially adapted to return to an environment first after a disturbance. Forest ecosystems and wetlands contain a number of specialized plant species forming persistent soil seed banks.

The absence of a soil seed bank impedes the establishment of vegetation during primary succession, while presence of a well-stocked soil seed bank permits rapid development of species-rich ecosystems during secondary succession.

== Seed longevity ==
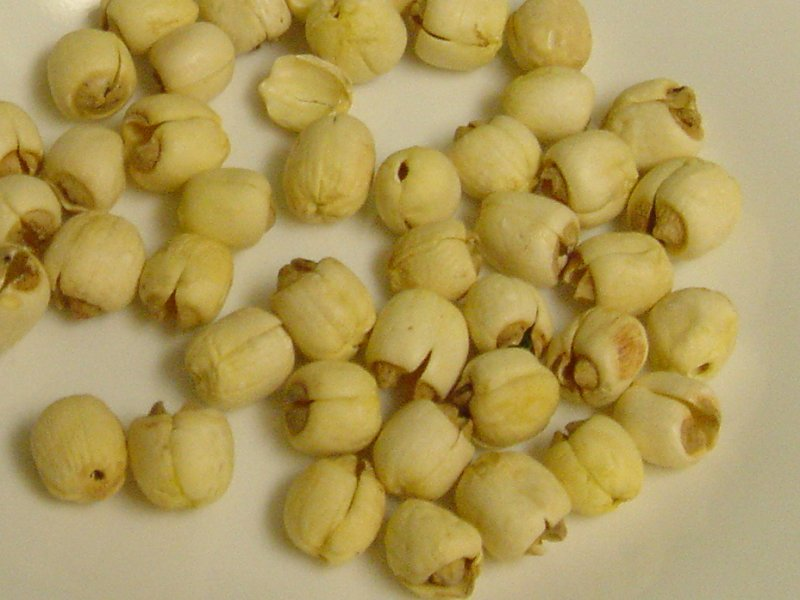
Dried lotus seeds

Many taxa have been classified according to the longevity of their seeds in the soil seed bank. Seeds of transient species remain viable in the soil seed bank only to the next opportunity to germinate, while seeds of persistent species can survive longer than the next opportunity—often much longer than one year. Species with seeds that remain viable in the soil longer than five years form the long-term persistent seed bank, while species whose seeds generally germinate or die within one to five years are called short-term persistent. A typical long-term persistent species is Chenopodium album (Lambsquarters); its seeds commonly remain viable in the soil for up to 40 years and in rare situations perhaps as long as 1,600 years. A species forming no soil seed bank at all (except the dry season between ripening and the first autumnal rains) is Agrostemma githago (Corncockle), which was formerly a widespread cereal weed.

Longevity of seeds is very variable and depends on many factors. Seeds buried more deeply tend to be capable of lasting longer. However, few species exceed 100 years. In typical soils the longevity of seeds can range from nearly zero (germinating immediately when reaching the soil or even before) to several hundred years. Some of the oldest still-viable seeds were those of Lotus (Nelumbo nucifera) found buried in the soil of a pond; these seeds were estimated by carbon dating to be around 1,200 years old. One cultivar of date palm, the Judean date palm, successfully sprouted in 2008 after accidental storage for 2,000 years.

== The famous seed longevity experiments ==
One of the longest-running soil seed viability trials was started in Michigan in 1879 by James Beal. The experiment involved the burying of 20 bottles holding 50 seeds from 21 species. Every five years, a bottle from every species was retrieved and germinated on a tray of sterilized soil which was kept in a growth chamber. Later, after responsibility for managing the experiment was delegated to caretakers, the period between retrievals became longer. In 1980, more than 100 years after the trial was started, seeds of only three species were observed to germinate: moth mullein (Verbascum blattaria), common mullein (Verbascum thapsus) and common mallow (Malva neglecta). Several other experiments have been conducted to determine the long-term longevity of seeds in soil seed banks.

Soil seed bank longevity of seeds in experimental conditions
| Species | Time | Comments |
|---|---|---|
| Verbascum blattaria | At least 142 years | |
| Verbascum thapsus | At least 100 years | |
| Malva neglecta | At least 100 years | |
| Oenothera biennis | 80 years | 10% of seeds sprouted after the 80-year mark |
| Rumex crispus | 80 years | Only 2% of seeds survived to this point. |
| Datura stramonium | At least 39 years | Over 90 percent germination rate was reported |
| Phytolacca americana | At least 39 years | 80-90 percent germination rate was reported |
| Solanum nigrum | At least 39 years | Over 80 percent germination rate was reported |
| Robinia pseudoacacia | At least 39 years | |
| Ambrosia artemisiifolia | At least 39 years | |
| Potentilla norvegica | At least 39 years | |
| Onopordum acanthium | At least 39 years | |
| Rudbeckia hirta | At least 39 years | |
| Cuscuta polygonorum | At least 39 years | |
| Lespedeza frutescens | At least 39 years | |
| Convolvulus sepium | At least 39 years | |
| Ipomoea lacunosa | At least 39 years | |
| Verbena hastata | At least 39 years | |
| Verbena urticifolia | At least 39 years | |
| Nicotiana tabacum | At least 39 years | |
| Arctium lappa | At least 39 years | Only 1 percent germination was reported. |
| Boehmeria nivea | At least 39 years | |
| Setaria verticillata | At least 39 years | |
| Trifolium pratense | At least 39 years | |
| Rumex obtusifolius | At least 39 years | |
| Rumex salicifolius | At least 39 years | |
| Chenopodium album | At least 39 years | |
| Chenopodium hybridum | At least 39 years | |
| Abutilon theophrasti | At least 39 years | |
| Leucanthemum vulgare | At least 39 years | |
| Hibiscus militaris | At least 39 years | |
| Hypericum hypericoides | At least 39 years | |
| Sporobolus cryptandrus | At least 39 years | |
| Polygonum scandens | At least 39 years | Germination rate was very low throughout the experiment. |
| Poa pratensis | At least 39 years | |
| Setaria viridis | At least 39 years | |
| Phalaris arundinacea | 30 years | Only 1 percent of seed survived. |
| Portulaca oleracea | 30 years | 38 percent of the most deeply buried seeds were viable at 21 years, 1 percent of more shallowly buried seeds are reported sprouting after the 30 year mark. |
| Polygonum pensylvanicum | 30 years | |
| Polygonum persicaria | 30 years | |
| Cassia marilandica | 30 years | |
| Thlaspi arvense | 30 years | |
| Trifolium hybridum | 30 years | |
| Ambrosia trifida | 21 years | |
| Brassica nigra | 21 years | |
| Dracocephalum parviflorum | 24.7 years | |
| Rorippa islandica | 24.7 years | |
| Matricaria discoidea | 24.7 years | |
| Polygonum aviculare | 24.7 years | |
| Helianthus annuus | 17 years | |
| Setaria parviflora | 17 years | |
| Cirsium arvense | 17 years | |
| Cirsium flodmanii | 17 years | |
| Ipomoea hederacea | 17 years | |
| Persicaria amphibia | 17 years | |
| Amaranthus tuberculatus | 17 years | |
| Solanum sarrachoides | 17 years | |
| Ambrosia grayii | 17 years | Only 1% of seed germinated. |
| Bassia scoparia | 17 years | Only 1% of seed germinated. |
| Echinochloa crus-galli | 17 years | Only 1% of seed germinated. |
| Amaranthus retroflexus | 12 years | |
| Pyrus calleryana | At least 11 years | |

== Other studies ==
Species of Striga (witchweed) are known to leave some of the highest seed densities in the soil compared to other plant genera; this is a major factor that aids their invasive potential. Each plant has the capability to produce between 90,000 and 450,000 seeds, although a majority of these seeds are not viable. It has been estimated that only two witchweeds would produce enough seeds required to refill a seed bank after seasonal losses. Before the advent of herbicides, a good example of a persistent seed bank species was Papaver rhoeas, sometimes so abundant in agricultural fields in Europe that it could be mistaken for a crop.

Studies on the genetic structure of Androsace septentrionalis populations in the seed bank compared to those of established plants showed that diversity within populations is higher below ground than above ground.
