= Ragnar Hult =

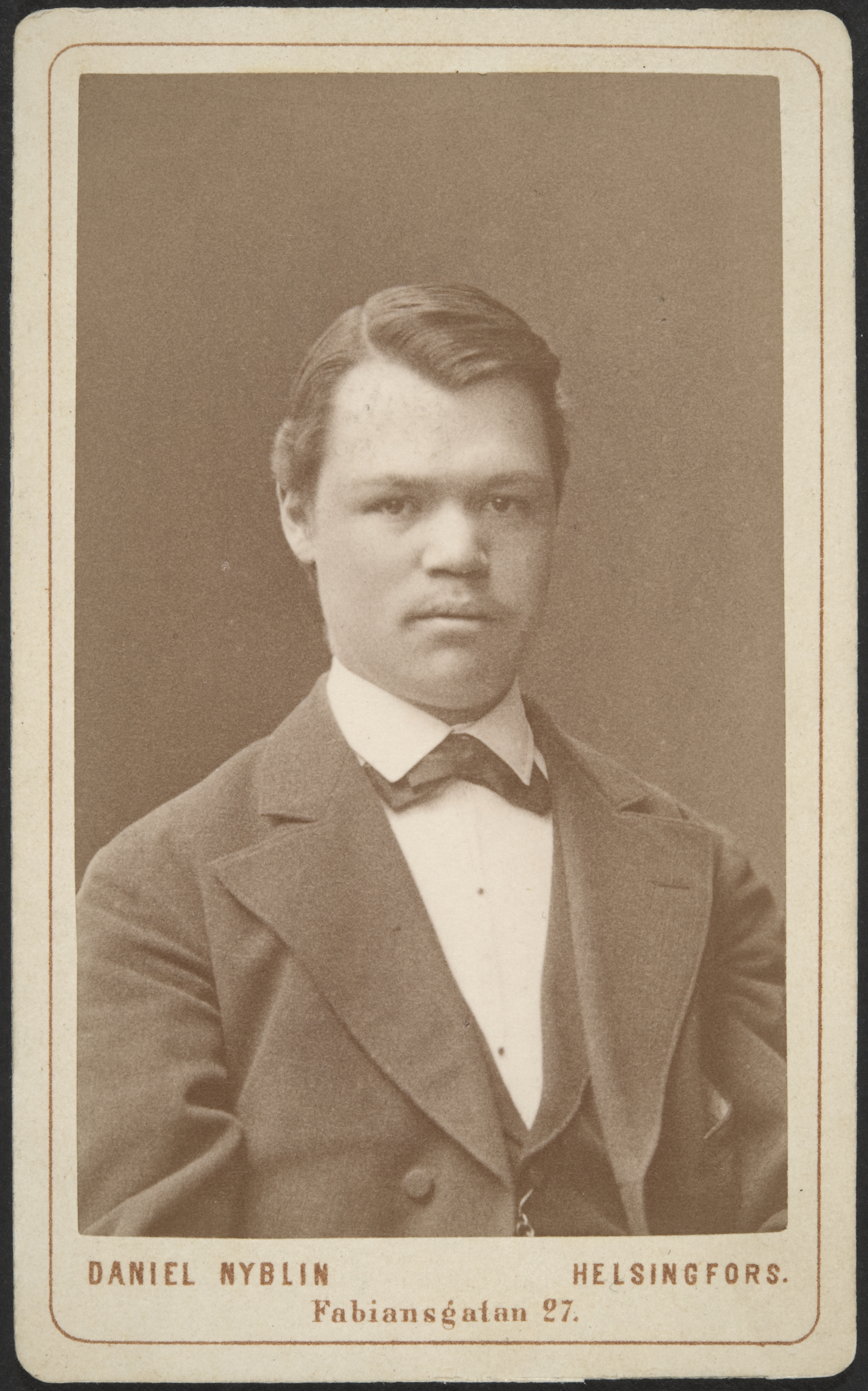
Ragnar Hult in the early 1880s.

Ragnar Hult (4 March 1857 – 25 September 1899) was a Finnish botanist and plant geographer. He was a forerunner in developing a methodology for vegetation survey. He emphasized the physiognomy of vegetation and paid less attention to its ecology. His ideas were much-followed in Sweden, making him the real father of the "Uppsala school" in plant sociology.

Ragnar Hult was the first (1881) to publish a comprehensive study of ecological succession as it is taking place in a given region. He was the first to recognize that a relatively large number of pioneer plant communities give way to a comparatively small number of relatively stable communities.

His study on the forests of Blekinge noted that grassland becomes heath before the heath develops into forest. Birch dominated the early stages of forest development, then pine (on dry soil) and spruce (on wet soil). If the birch is replaced by oak it eventually develops to beechwood. Swamps proceed from moss to sedges to moor vegetation followed by birch and finally spruce.

== Selected works ==
- Hult, Ragnar (1881) Försök till analytisk behandling af växtformationerna (“Attempt at an analytic treatment of plant communities”). Meddelanden af Societas pro Fauna et Flora Fennica, 8, pp. 1–155. Doctoral dissertation (University of Helsinki). Full text.
