= Aquatic succession =

In geology, aquatic succession is the process in which a glacial lake dries up. Over the lifespan of a glacier it dissolves into a body of water. Aquatic succession is the continuing steps of that solid water-turned-lake melting into the ground and further disappearing. The lakes sometime become underground lakes or rivers. The water tends to remain part of the local hydrosphere by percolating into aquifers.

There is no single way this occurs; "aquatic succession can follow many different pathways."
