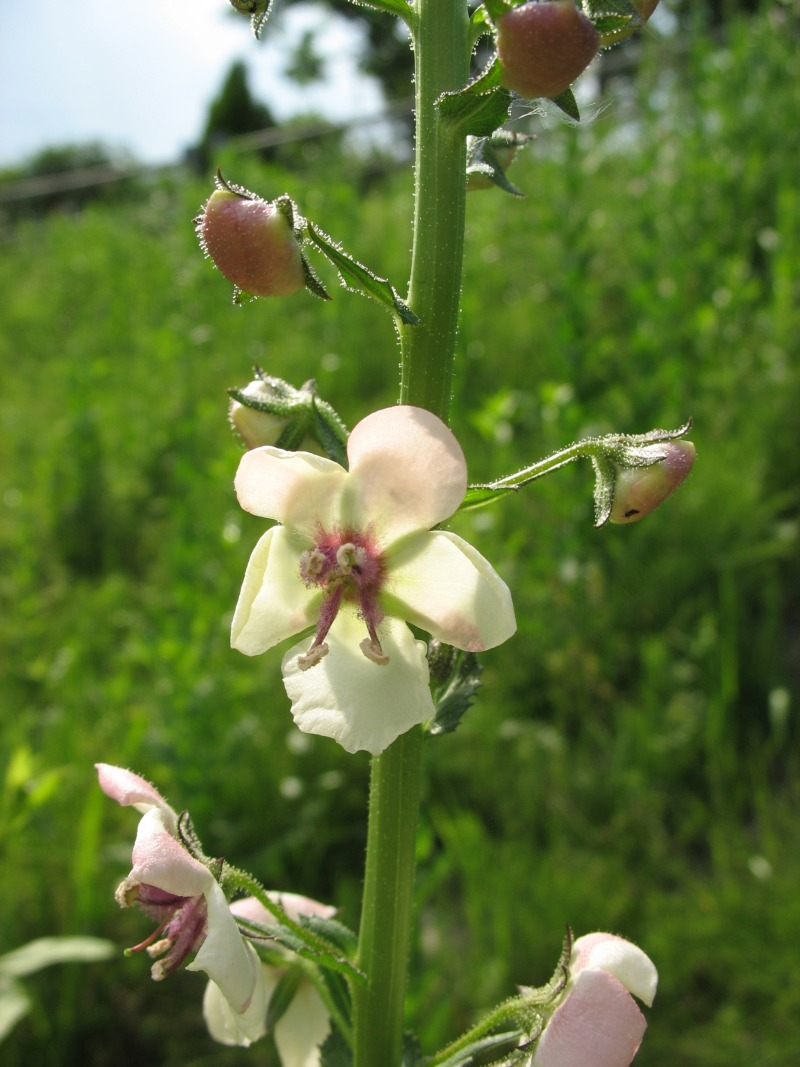
- Raceme

Scientific classification
- Kingdom: Plantae
- Clade: Tracheophytes
- Clade: Angiosperms
- Clade: Eudicots
- Clade: Asterids
- Order: Lamiales
- Family: Scrophulariaceae
- Genus: Verbascum
- Species: V. blattaria

Binomial name
- Verbascum blattaria L.

= Verbascum blattaria =

Species of flowering plant

Verbascum blattaria, the moth mullein, is a flowering biennial plant belonging to the figwort family Scrophulariaceae. A native of Eurasia and North Africa, it has naturalized in the United States and most of Canada since its introduction and has become an invasive species there. It has been declared a noxious weed by the state of Colorado. However, other states, such as Washington, consider it insignificant in terms of competition with native species.

== Common name ==
Verbascum blattaria is more commonly referred to as the moth mullein, so named because of the resemblance of its flower's stamens to a moth’s antennae. This is not to be confused with the more popular and widely known common mullein (V. thapsus), a close relative of V. blattaria.

== Description ==
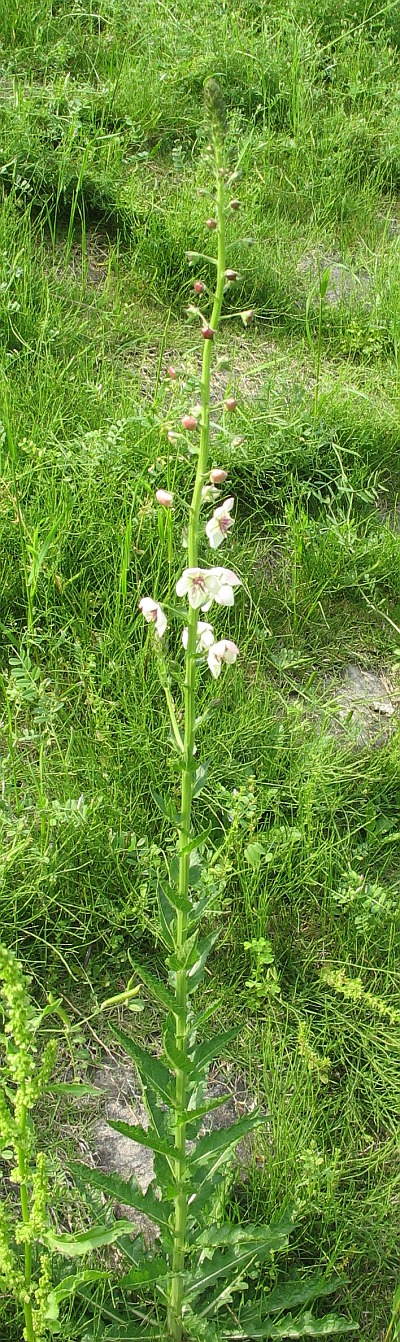

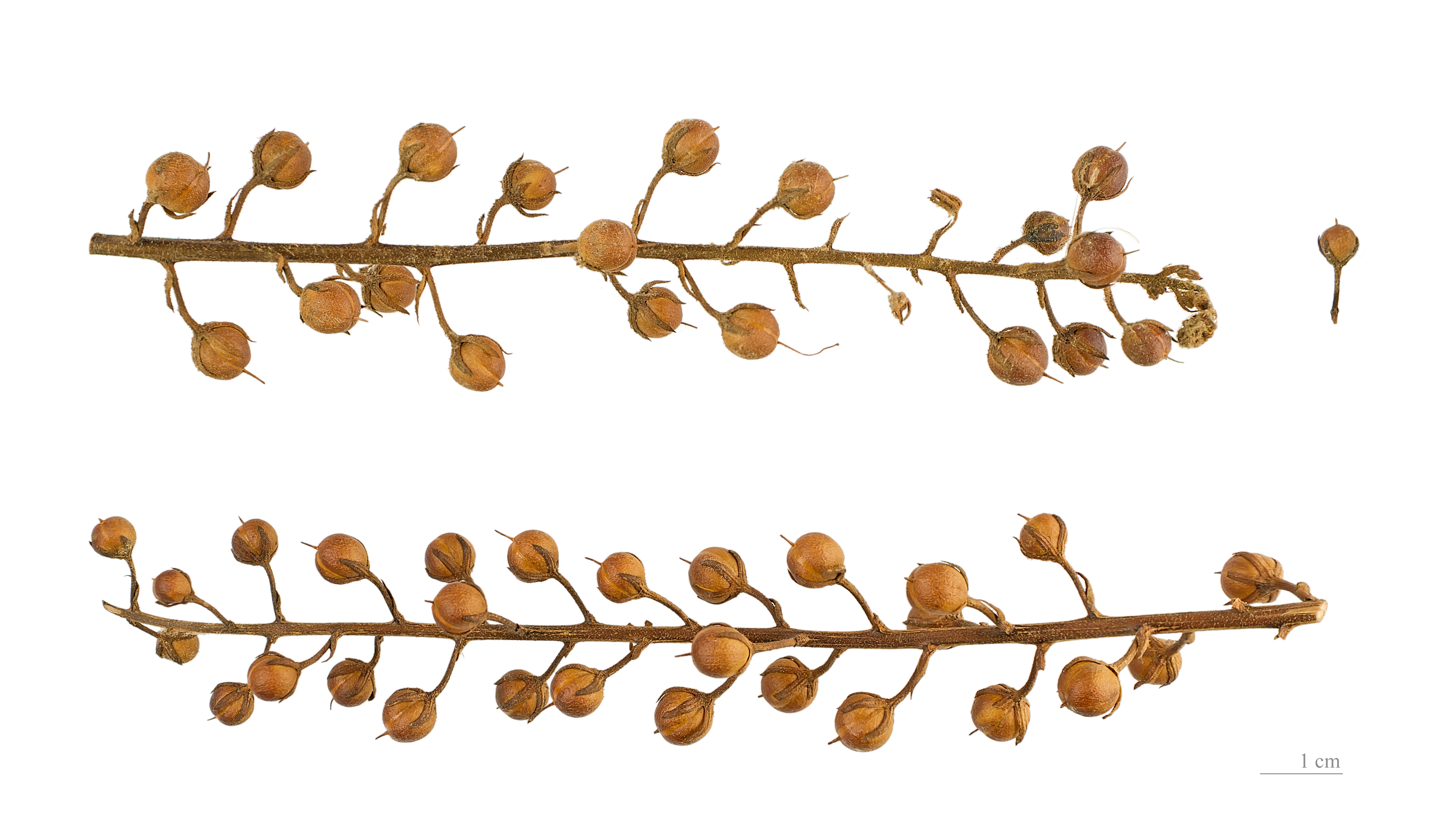
Capsules

The moth mullein is a biennial plant. In its first year after sowing, its leaves develop as a basal rosette. During this first year, the stem of the plant remains extremely short. The leaves of the rosette are oblanceolate with deeply toothed edges and are attached to the stem by short petioles. The rosette can grow to a diameter of 16 inches (41 cm) during this first year, with each individual leaf reaching a length up to 8 inches (20 cm). The mullein forms a fibrous root system with a deep taproot.

In the second year of growth, the stem grows slender and erect, and can reach a height of 1 1/2 to 3 feet (1/2 to 1 m). This length of stem is commonly referred to as the flowering stem. It usually grows unbranched, and leaves grow alternatively directly off the stem. The leaves located on the flowering stem are similar to the leaves of the rosette; however, they tend to be smaller and elliptical with shallow-toothed edges and have sharply pointed tips. These leaves can reach a length of 5 inches (13 cm). Both the leaves of the rosette and the leaves of the flowering stem are dark green in color and glabrous (hairless).

The flowers are produced during the second year of growth on a loose raceme. Each flower is attached individually to the flowering stem by a pedicel. Each pedicel typically reaches a length less than 1 inch (2.5 cm). The flowers of the mullein consist of five petals and five anther-bearing stamens, and each flower can reach a diameter of 1 inch (25 mm). The flowers can be either yellow or white and typically have a slight purple tinge. The stamens of the flower are orange in color and are covered in purple hairs, reminiscent to a moth’s antennae. The flowers of the mullein bloom between June and October of the second year.

The moth mullein grows a small, simple fruit that is spherical in shape and has a diameter less than 0.5 inches (13 mm). Each fruit is dark brown in color and contains numerous dark brown seeds. The fruit of the mullein develops, matures, and falls from the plant all in the second year of growth. In certain regions of the world, finches have been known to consume and distribute the seeds.

== Distribution ==
A native of Europe, Asia, and North Africa, Verbascum blattaria has naturalized in most of North America since its introduction. It was first recorded in Pennsylvania in 1818, and was recorded in Michigan in 1840. It has since been found in almost every one of the continental United States, as well as in southern Canada and even Hawaii. In the United States, it is found most abundantly along the East Coast.

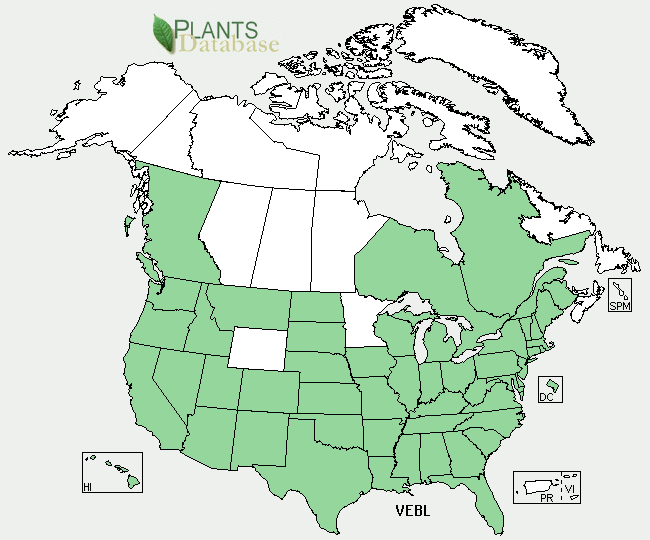
Distribution of V. blattaria in the US and Canada

Though having a wide range of habitats, Verbascum blattaria is typically found in open fields such as pastures and meadows. It can also be found in open woods. The moth mullein prefers rich soils, but is tolerant of dry, sandy, and even gravelly soils.

== Uses ==
Even in folk medicine, Verbascum blattaria has not been attributed to a wide range of uses. However, a study conducted in 1974 reported that when a number of Aedes aegypti mosquito larvae were exposed to a methanol extract of moth mullein, at least 53% of the larvae were killed. V. blattaria has also long been known to be an effective cockroach repellent, and the name blattaria is actually derived from the Latin word for cockroach, blatta.

== Viability ==
In a famous long-term experiment, Dr. William James Beal, then a professor of botany at Michigan Agriculture College, selected seeds of 21 different plant species (including Verbascum blattaria) and placed seeds of each in 20 separate bottles filled with sand. The bottles, left uncorked, were buried mouth down (so as not to allow moisture to reach the seeds) in a sandy knoll in 1879. The purpose of this experiment was to determine how long the seeds could be buried dormant in the soil, and yet germinate in the future when planted. In 2000, one of these bottles was dug up, and 23 seeds of V. blattaria were planted in favorable conditions, yielding a 50% germination rate.
