= Pioneer species =

First species to colonize or inhabit damaged ecosystems

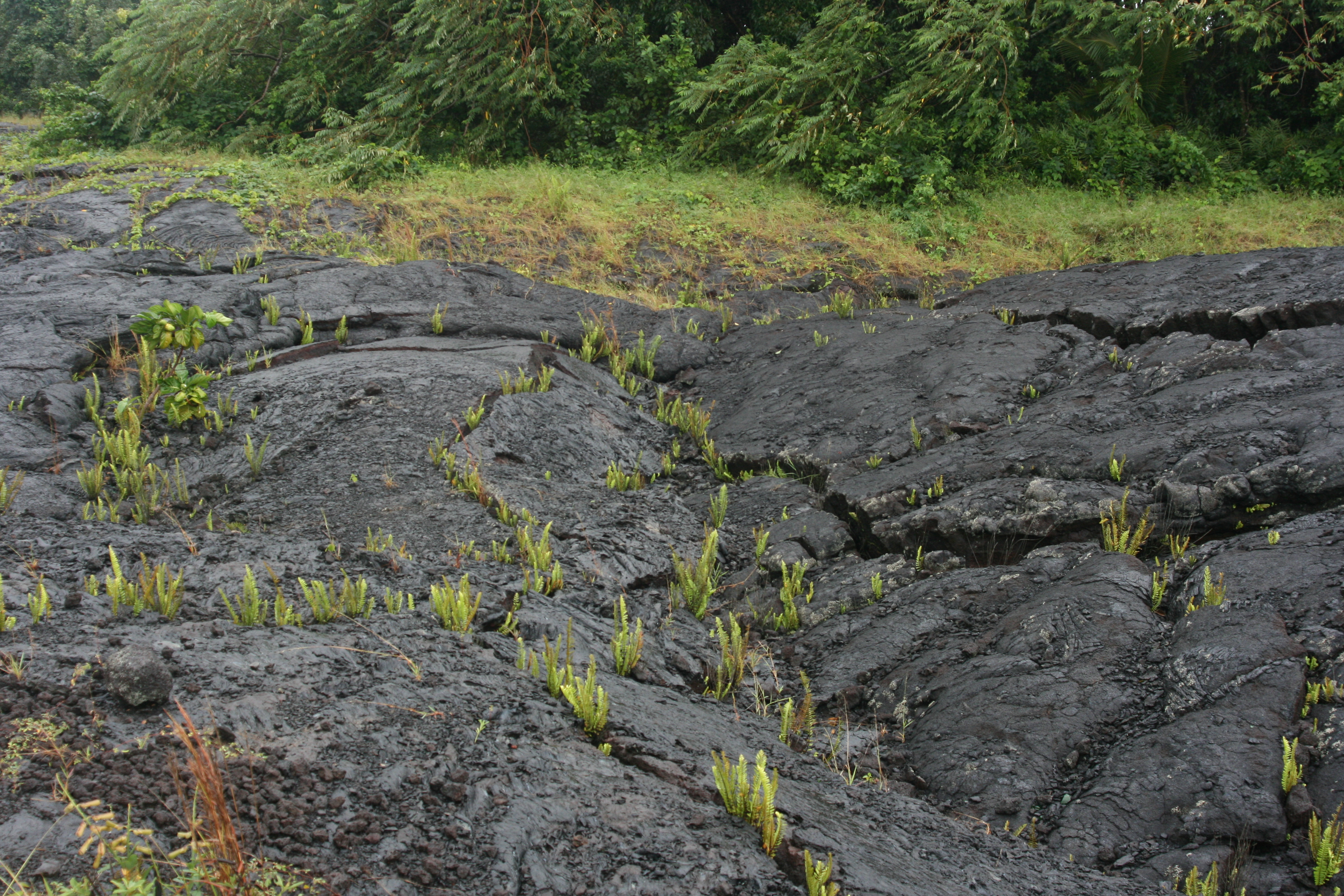
Pioneer species of plant growing in cracks on a solidified recently erupted lava flow in Hawaii

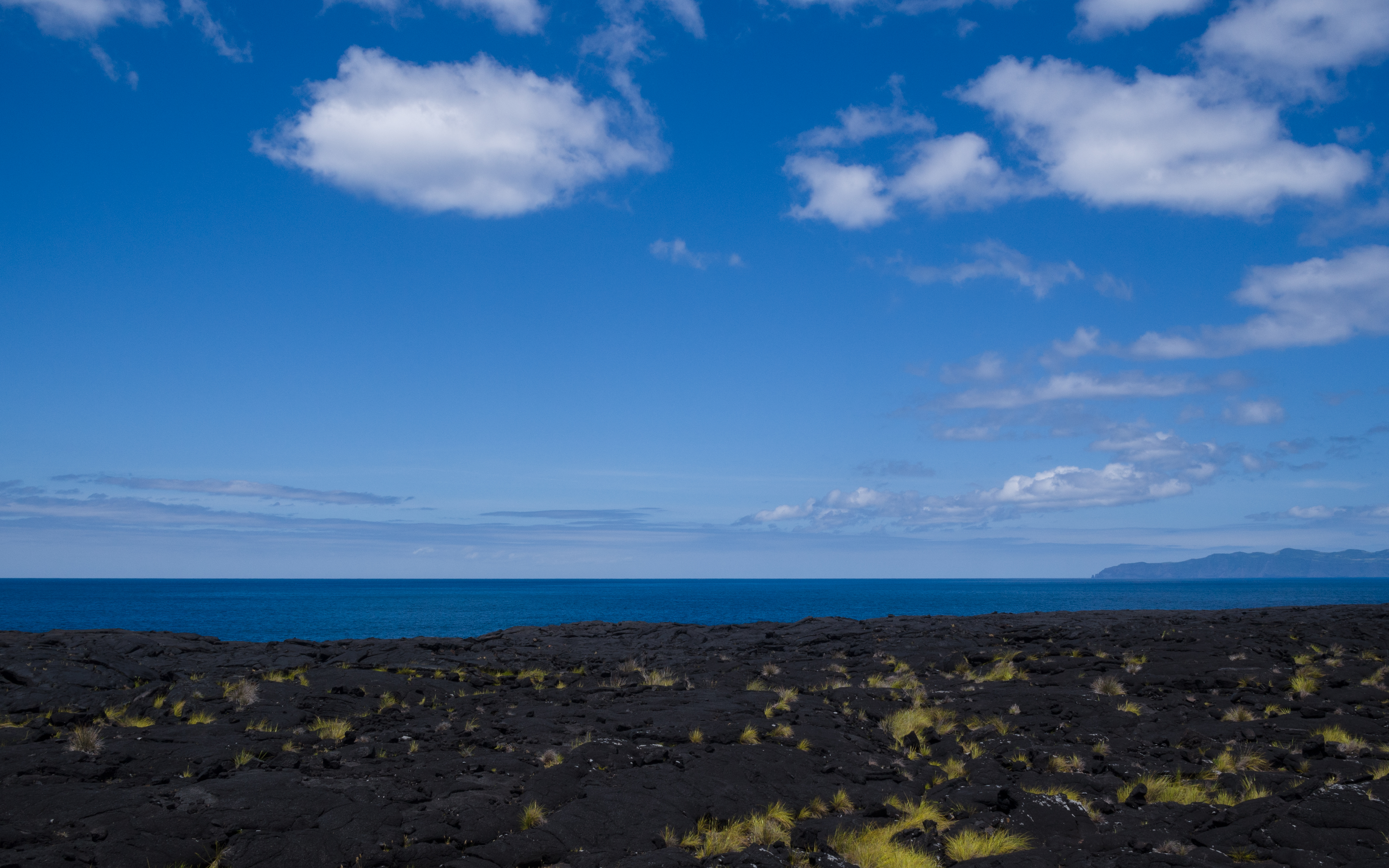
Pioneer plants growing on solidified lava on Pico, Azores, avoiding local laurisilva competition

Pioneer species are resilient species that are the first to colonize barren environments, or to repopulate disrupted biodiverse steady-state ecosystems as part of ecological succession. Various kinds of events can create good conditions for pioneers, including disruption by natural disasters, such as wildfire, flood, mudslide, lava flow or a climate-related extinction event, or by anthropogenic habitat destruction, such as through land clearance for agriculture or construction or industrial damage. Pioneer species play an important role in creating soil in primary succession, and stabilizing soil and nutrients in secondary succession.

Because pioneer species quickly occupy disrupted spaces, they are sometimes treated as weeds or nuisance wildlife by humans, such as the common dandelion or stinging nettle. Even though humans have mixed relationships with these plants, these species tend to help improve the ecosystem because they can break up compacted soils and accumulate nutrients that help with a transition back to a more mature ecosystem. In human-managed ecological restoration or agroforestry, trees and herbaceous pioneers can be used to restore soil qualities and provide shelter for slower growing or more demanding plants. Some systems use introduced species to restore the ecosystem, or for environmental remediation. The durability of pioneer species can also make them potential invasive species.

== Pioneer flora ==
As uninhabited or disrupted land may have thin, poor quality soils with few nutrients, pioneer species are often hardy plants with adaptations such as long roots, root nodes containing nitrogen-fixing bacteria, and leaves that employ transpiration. These plants are often photosynthetic, as no other source of energy except light is typically available in the early stages of succession. Some lichens can grow on rocks without soil, and may be among the first pioneer species, breaking down the rocks into soil for plants.

The plants that are often pioneer species tend to be wind-pollinated rather than insect-pollinated, as insects are unlikely to be present in the usually barren conditions in which pioneer species grow. Pioneer species also tend to reproduce asexually altogether, as the extreme or barren conditions make it more favourable to reproduce asexually in order to increase reproductive success rather than invest energy into sexual reproduction. Pioneer species eventually die, create plant litter, and break down as "leaf mold" after some time, making new soil for secondary succession, and releasing nutrients for small fish and aquatic plants in adjacent bodies of water.

Some examples of pioneering plant species in various habitats:

- Barren sand - lyme grass (Leymus arenarius), sea couch grass (Agropyron pungens), Marram grass (Ammophila breviligulata)
- Salt water - green algae, marine eel grass (Zostera spp.), pickleweed (Salicornia virginica), cordgrass (hybrid Sporobolus × townsendii and Sporobolus anglicus)
- Fresh water - algae, mosses, freshwater eel grass (Vallisneria americana)
- Solidified lava flows (volcanic rock) -
  - in Hawaii: swordfern (Polystichum munitum), ‘ōhi‘a lehua (Metrosideros polymorpha), ‘ohelo (Vaccinium reticulatum), ‘āma‘u (Sadleria cyatheoides);
  - on Surtsey: lichen (Stereocaulon vesuvianum and Placopsis gelida), moss (Racomitrium ericoides), green algae
- Disturbed areas such as construction sites, road cuttings and verges, cultivated lands - see ruderal species
- Mountains - lichens

== Pioneer fauna ==
=== On land ===
The diagram above shows how pioneer species lead to soil formation and allow less rugged fauna to grow in the area.: 1. Bare rock; 2. Weathering allows hardy pioneer species to grow on the rocks.; 3. Decomposition of pioneer species provides organic material to make soil.; 4. Small annual plants are able to grow on the soil.; 5. As the soil layer grows plants such as trees are able to colonize the area.

Pioneering fauna will colonize an area only after flora and fungi have inhabited the area. Soil fauna, ranging from microscopic protists to larger invertebrates, have a role in soil formation and nutrient cycling. Bacteria and fungi are the most important groups in the breakdown of organic detritus left by primary producing plants such as skeletal soil, moss and algae. Soil invertebrates enhance fungal activity by breaking down detritus. As soil develops, earthworms and ants alter soil characteristics. Worm burrows aerate soil and ant hills alter sediment particle size dispersal, altering soil character profoundly.

Though vertebrates in general are not considered pioneer species, there are exceptions. Natterjack toads (Epidalea calamita) are specialists in open, sparsely vegetated habitats which may be at an early seral stage. Wide-ranging generalists visit early succession stage habitats, but are not obligate species of those habitats because they use a mosaic of different habitats.

Vertebrates can affect early seral stages. Herbivores may alter plant growth. Fossorial mammals could alter soil and plant community development. In a profound example, a seabird colony transfers considerable nitrogen into infertile soils, thereby altering plant growth. A keystone species may facilitate the introduction of pioneer species by creating new niches. For example, beavers may flood an area, allowing new species to immigrate.

=== Underwater ===
The concept of ecologic succession also applies to underwater habitats. If a space becomes newly available in a reef surrounding, haplosclerid and calcareous sponges are the first animals to initially occur in this environment in greater numbers than other species. These types of sponges grow faster and have a shorter life-span than the species which follow them in this habitat.

== Pioneer species in the anthropocene ==
Following ecological disturbances caused by humans, such as post-industrial areas where there may be high amounts of toxic waste, certain pioneer species such as those that can withstand heavy metals will begin to grow. Vascular plants tend to draw in contaminants from the soil through their roots, so often the first plants to colonize such an environment are lichens and bryophytes (mosses, liverworts, and hornworts) because they do not have true roots.

Due to harsh impacts from grazing livestock in certain areas, soils may be degraded by erosion, resulting in shallow soils. In restoration efforts, certain pioneer species are used which can withstand poor growing conditions. Black locust (Robinia pseudoacacia) is often used to restore post-grazing pastures, because it can grow in eroded environments and has nitrogen-fixing abilities, which add nutrients to the soil and improve the chance of success for other plant species. Over time, black locust adds organic matter and increases the depth of soil, which helps other species of plants reestablish.

== Secondary succession and pioneer species ==
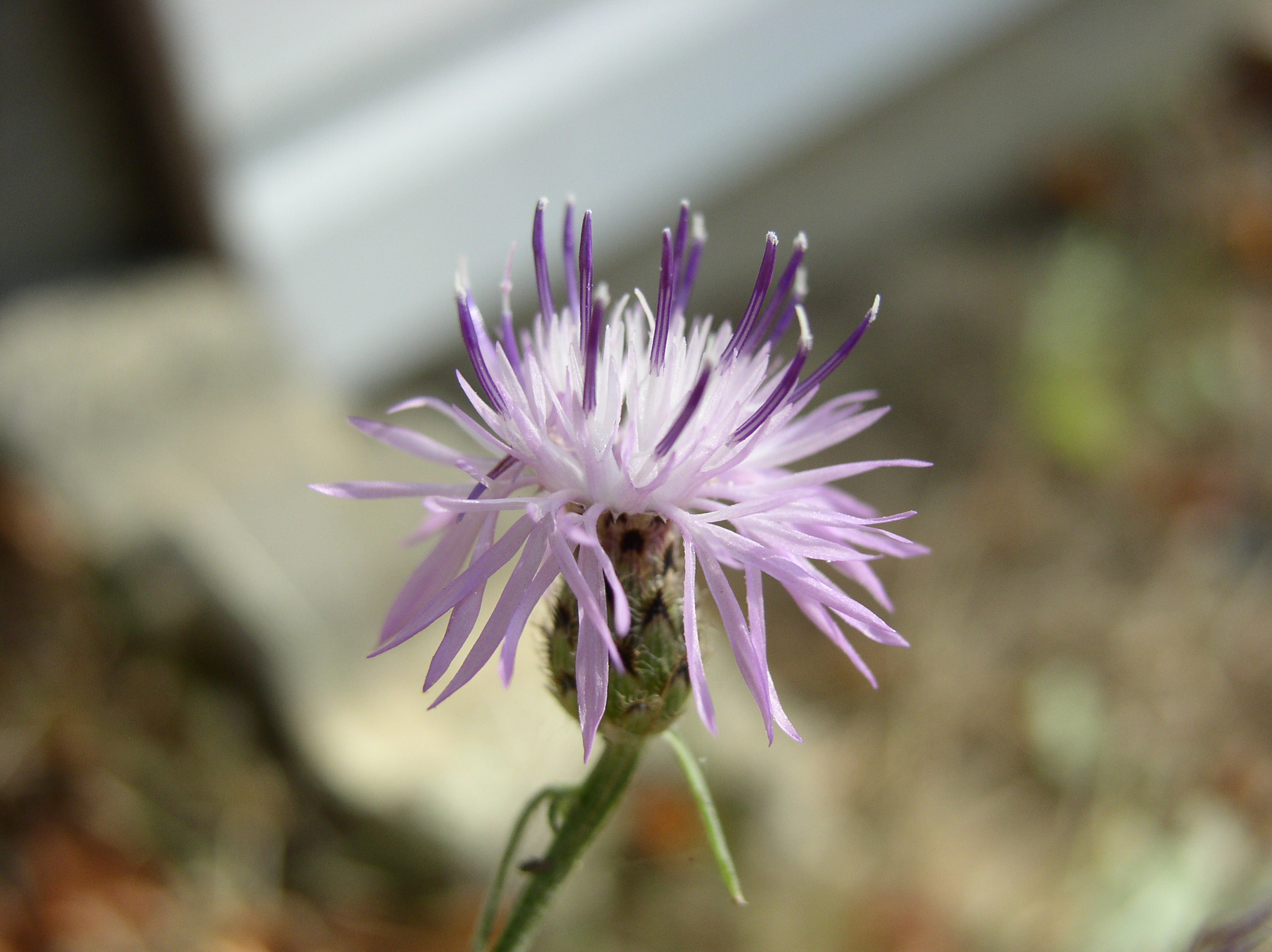
Centaurea maculosa, an example of a pioneer species

The term pioneer species is also used to refer to the first species, usually plants, to return to an area after disturbance as part of the process of secondary succession. Disturbances may include floods, tornadoes, forest fires, deforestation, or clearing by other means.

Pioneer species tend to be fast-growing, shade-intolerant, and tend to reproduce large numbers of offspring quickly. The seeds of pioneer species can sometimes remain viable for years or decades in the soil seed bank and often are triggered to sprout by disturbance. Mycorrhizal fungi have a powerful influence on the growth of pioneer species.

Some examples of the plants in such areas include:

- Raspberry - Rubus spp.
- Heaths - Ericaceae spp.
- Graminoids, forbs, and wildflowers - native, introduced, and invasive species: such as fire dependent seed, cone, and resprouter chaparral genera.

== See also ==
- Colony (biology)
- Ruderal species
- Climax species
- Weed
