= Primary succession =

Gradual growth and change of an ecosystem on new substrate

Primary succession occurring over time. The soil depths increase with respect to the increase in decomposition of organic matter, and there is a gradual increase of species diversity in the ecosystem. The labels I-VII represent the different stages of primary succession. I-bare rocks, II-pioneers (mosses, lichen, algae, fungi), III-annual herbaceous plants, IV-perennial herbaceous plants and grasses, V-shrubs, VI-shade intolerant trees, VII-shade tolerant trees.

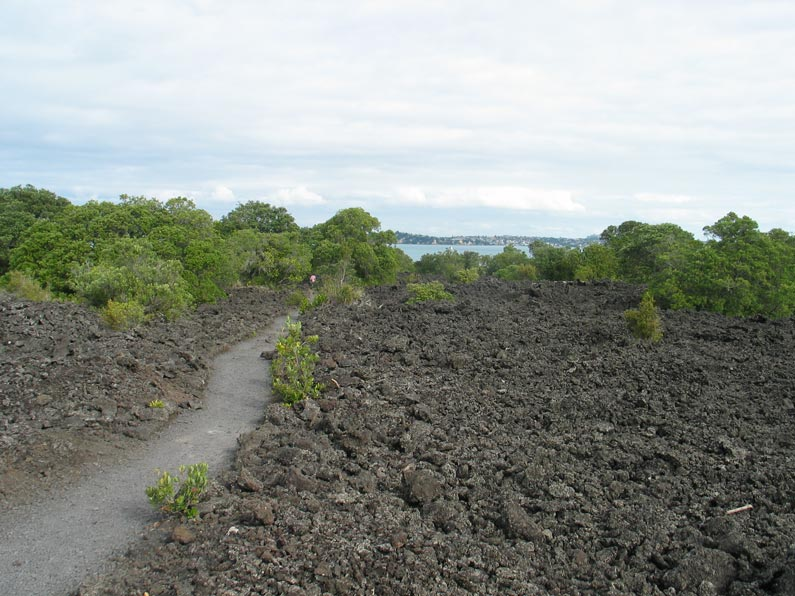
Primary succession on Rangitoto Island, New Zealand

Primary succession is the beginning step of ecological succession where species known as pioneer species colonize an uninhabited site, which usually occurs in an environment devoid of vegetation and other organisms.

In contrast, secondary succession occurs on substrates that previously supported vegetation before an ecological disturbance. This occurs when smaller disturbances like floods, hurricanes, tornadoes, and fires destroy only the local plant life and leave soil nutrients for immediate establishment by intermediate community species.

== Occurrence ==
In primary succession pioneer species like lichen, algae and fungi as well as abiotic factors like wind and water start to "normalise" the habitat or in other words start to develop soil and other important mechanisms for greater diversity to flourish. Primary succession begins on rock formations, such as volcanoes or mountains, or in a place with no organisms or soil. Primary succession leads to conditions nearer optimum for vascular plant growth; pedogenesis or the formation of soil, and the increased amount of shade are the most important processes.

These pioneer lichen, algae, and fungi are then dominated and often replaced by plants that are better adapted to less harsh conditions, these plants include vascular plants like grasses and some shrubs that are able to live in thin soils that are often mineral-based. Water and nutrient levels increase with the amount of succession exhibited.

The early stages of primary succession are dominated by species with small propagules (seed and spores) which can be dispersed long distances. The early colonizers—often algae, fungi, and lichens—stabilize the substrate. Nitrogen supplies are limited in new soils, and nitrogen-fixing species tend to play an important role early in primary succession. Unlike in primary succession, the species that dominate secondary succession, are usually present from the start of the process, often in the soil seed bank. In some systems the successional pathways are fairly consistent, and thus, are easy to predict. In others, there are many possible pathways. For example, nitrogen-fixing legumes alter successional trajectories.

Spores of lichen or fungus, being the pioneer species, are spread onto a land of rocks. Then, the rocks are broken down into smaller particles. Organic matter gradually accumulates, favoring the growth of herbaceous plants like grass, ferns and herbs. These plants further improve the habitat by creating more organic matter when they die, and providing habitats for insects and other small animals. This leads to the occurrence of larger vascular plants like shrubs, or trees. More animals are then attracted to the area and a climax community is reached.

Species diversity is also a large influence on the stages of succession, and as succession progresses further, species diversity changes with it. For example, there is far less richness and evenness of microorganisms in the very early stages of succession, but late successional stage bacteria are far more even and rich. This again supports the hypothesis that as more resources are present in later stages of succession, there is enough to support a more diverse ecosystem with many different reproductive strategies. A 2000 case study suggests that plant species composition is more important to later-successional species than simply having high plant diversity early on.

== Examples ==
=== Volcanism ===
One example of primary succession takes place after a volcano has erupted. The lava flows into the ocean and hardens into new land. The resulting barren land is first colonized by pioneer organisms, like algae, which pave the way for later, less hardy plants, such as hardwood trees, by facilitating pedogenesis, especially through the biotic acceleration of weathering and the addition of organic debris to the surface regolith. An example of this is the island of Surtsey, which is an island formed in 1963 after a volcanic eruption from beneath the sea. Surtsey is off the south coast of Iceland and is being monitored to observe primary succession in progress. About thirty species of plant had become established by 2008 and more species continue to arrive, at a typical rate of roughly 2–5 new species per year.

A volcanic eruption occurred on Mount St. Helens as well, with primary succession beginning after the destruction of the region's ecosystem. In Mount St. Helens' primary succession, the region was heavily isolated. This type of incident causes the rate of primary succession to be rather low, as many species that excel in establishment lack the ability to effectively disperse into the new frontier. The opposite is true as well, as species that were not very good at establishing could not survive, even with high dispersal rates. The region has almost no organic materials to utilize, which was especially significant at Mount St. Helens, as its isolated location prevented succession to occur at the periphery of the destruction site. Initially effective long distance colonizers are rare, as they are only truly effective after an initial colonizer has helped to change the region into more suitable conditions. This is why primary succession was slow in the destroyed region around Mount St. Helens.

=== Glacier Retreat ===
Another example is taking place on Signy Island in the South Orkney Islands of Antarctica, due to glacier retreat. Glacier retreat is becoming more normal with the warming climate, and lichens and mosses are the first colonizers. The study, conducted by Favero-Longo et al. found that lichen species diversity varies based on the environmental conditions of the previously existing earth that is first exposed, and the lichens' reproductive patterns.

=== The characteristics of succession ===
By analyzing a case study in Grand Bend, Ontario, a full understanding of the distinction between primary and secondary succession can be accomplished. The two species, Juniperus virginiana and Quercus prinoides, are quickly reproducing and spreading grasses that are associated with primary succession in the dunes of Grand Bend's beaches. They are classified as r selected species, with high mortality, quick reproduction, and a distinct ability to survive in harsh and nutrient-low conditions. In contrast, ecological development after primary succession completes often leads to a more heavily k selected population, which has lower mortality and slower reproduction rates. In the Grand Bend, this is shown through the succession of oak-pine forests, and the continued reduction of r selected grasses. The timescale is also relevant, as the secondary succession of oak-pine forests occurs approximately 2,900 years after the initial cases of primary succession, while the end of solely grassland dominated dunes occurs around 1,600 years after the beginning of primary succession. This is extremely important, as it shows a 1,300 year intermittent period in which primary succession is overcome by secondary succession. This period is likely characterized by high species diversity, a mix of k and r selected species, and high community productivity. It is a well-supported principle that an intermediate between k and r dominated populations leads to high productivity and species diversity, while the secondary succession afterwards leads towards climax communities with low species diversity. During this 1,300 year period, it is likely that resources grew into a surplus, which reduced species diversity, resulting in the k dominated oak-pine forest.

It is very difficult to determine exactly what events will hinder or support the growth of a community, as shown in the following example. Very few seedlings survive for a long period of time during primary succession, with 1.7% of seedlings in an outwash plain named Skeiðarársandur in southeast Iceland lasting from 2005 to 2007. The rest were replaced by new colonizers, as the mortality rates for r selected species like these are extremely high. This is a very important phenomenon to observe, as even though population sizes may remain consistent throughout the history of a region, it is highly likely that many of the r selected organisms present are entirely new organisms. This is one of many factors that are highly unpredictable in the scale of ecological succession.

== Related Topics ==
- Ecological succession
- Lithophyte
- Pioneer species
- Secondary succession
- Soil creation
- Stability (ecology)
