= Pedotope =

Pedotope is the total soil component of the abiotic matrix present in an ecotope. The pedotope is not one particular kind of soil, nor even the dominant kind of soil available in a location, but rather the total soil component (of all varieties) available in the location.

== See also ==
- Ecological land classification
