= List of national vegetation classification systems =

This is a List of national vegetation classification systems. These systems classify natural habitat type according to vegetation.

Many schemes of vegetation classification are in use by the land, resource and environmental management agencies of different national and state jurisdictions. The International Vegetation Classification (IVC or EcoVeg) has been recently proposed but has not been yet widely adopted.

== List ==
- Australia
  - New South Wales: Vegetation Information System, NSW Vegetation Classification and Assessment (NSWVCA)
  - Victoria: Ecological Vegetation Class
  - Tasmania: TASVEG ecological vegetation community mapping units
- Austria: Austrian Vegetation Database, computerized phytosociological information (vegetation relevés).
- Belgium: Vlavedat (Flemish Vegetation Databank)
- Brazil: Manual Técnico da Vegetação Brasileira (IBGE, second edition, 2012).
- Canada: Canadian National Vegetation Classification (CNVC) Full taxonomic vegetation 8-level hierarchy based on floristic, ecological, and physiognomic criteria. Based on 'associations' and 'alliances'.
- Czech Republic: Czech National Phytosociological Database, computerized phytosociological information (vegetation relevés).
- Denmark: Danske Vegetationstyper
- Europe: SynBioSys Europe information system of distributed European TURBOVEG databases relating to plant species, vegetation and landscape data administered by the European Vegetation Survey. When completed this will contain 30 national species lists.
- France: Sophy, computerized phytosociological information (vegetation relevés).
- Germany: FloraWeb website of the Bundesamt für Naturschutz (German Federal Nature Agency, or Bfn) for wild plant species, plant communities, and the natural vegetation of Germany. This includes VegetWeb the central German vegetation database.
- Germany: German Vegetation Reference Database (GVRD) digitized German forest and grassland vegetation relevés at the University of Halle.
- Great Britain: British National Vegetation Classification (NVC), based on the five volume British Plant Communities, published by Cambridge University Press ISBN 0-521-79716-0. Classification is by 'community', 'subcommunity' and 'variant'.
- Ireland: Irish Vegetation Classification, based on plot data from the National Vegetation Database.
- New Zealand: National Vegetation Survey Databank (NVS), physical archive and computer databank recording approximately 77,000 vegetation survey plots.; New Zealand Terrestrial Ecosystems (based on Ecosystem Units)
- Poland: Geobotanical regionalization of Poland, Potential natural vegetation of Poland, ' Polish Vegetation Database, System of Exchange of Information on Biodiversity in Poland - databases, Monitoring of species and natural habitats, Databank on Forests - interactive GIS map, Guide for determining plant associations in Poland
- Slovakia: Centrálnej databázy fytocenologických zápisov (Central Database of Phytosociological Relevés, CDF)
- United States: U.S. National Vegetation Classification (NVC), a hierarchical system of vegetation types. Upper levels of the NVC are mainly based primarily on physiognomy (growth form, cover, structure) and the lower levels on floristics (species composition and abundance). The NVC is maintained for the U.S. government by the non-profit group NatureServe.
- United States: Vegbank, vegetation plot database of the Ecological Society of America.

== See also ==
- Ecological land classification
