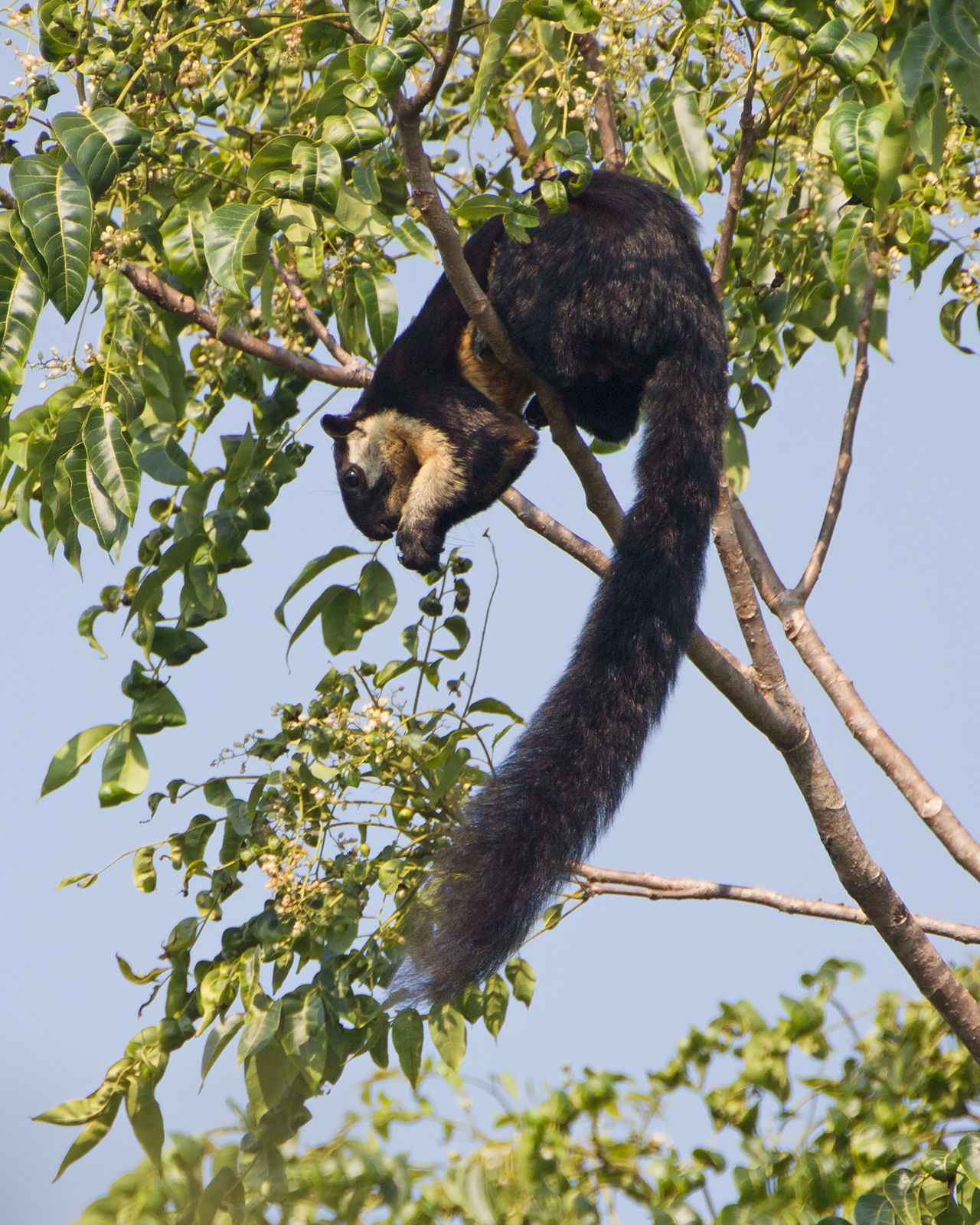

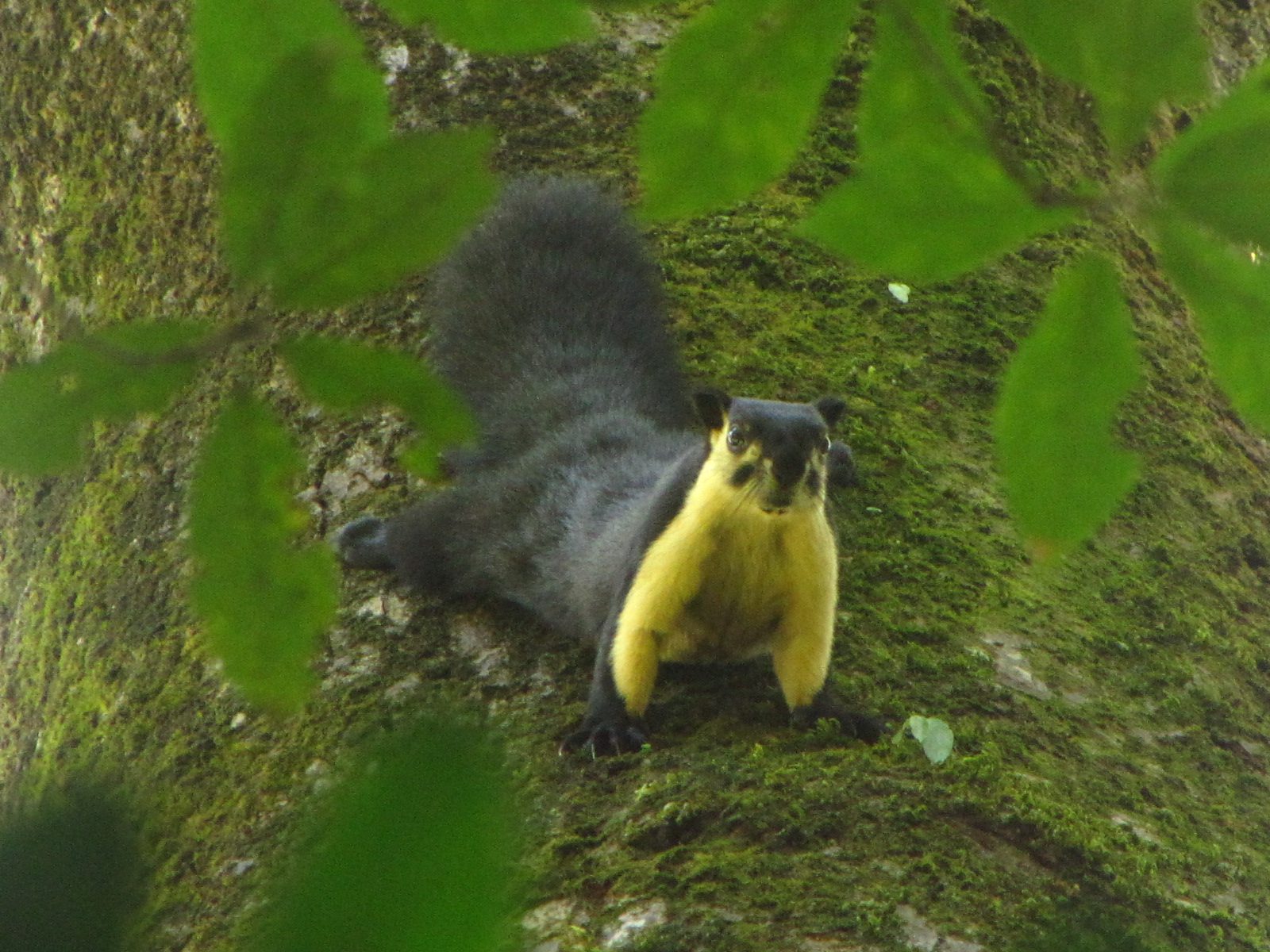
- Above in Khao Yai National Park, Thailand; below in Namdapha Tiger Reserve, India

Conservation status
- Near Threatened (IUCN 3.1)
- CITES Appendix II

Scientific classification
- Kingdom: Animalia
- Phylum: Chordata
- Class: Mammalia
- Infraclass: Placentalia
- Order: Rodentia
- Family: Sciuridae
- Genus: Ratufa
- Species: R. bicolor

Binomial name
- Ratufa bicolor (Sparrman, 1778)

Subspecies
- R. b. bicolor; R. b. condorensis; R. b. felli; R. b. gigantea; R. b. hainana; R. b. leucogenys; R. b. melanopepla; R. b. palliata; R. b. phaeopepla; R. b. smithi
- Black giant squirrel range (erroneously missing Java and Bali)

Synonyms
- Tennentii, source: Layard, in Blyth, 1849

= Black giant squirrel =

Malayan black giant squirrel

Species of rodent

The black giant squirrel or Malayan giant squirrel (Ratufa bicolor) is a large tree squirrel in the genus Ratufa native to the Indomalayan zootope. It is found in forests from northern Bangladesh, northeast India, eastern Nepal, Bhutan, southern China, Myanmar, Laos, Thailand, West Malaysia, Cambodia, Vietnam, and western Indonesia (Java, Sumatra, Bali and nearby small islands).

== Description ==
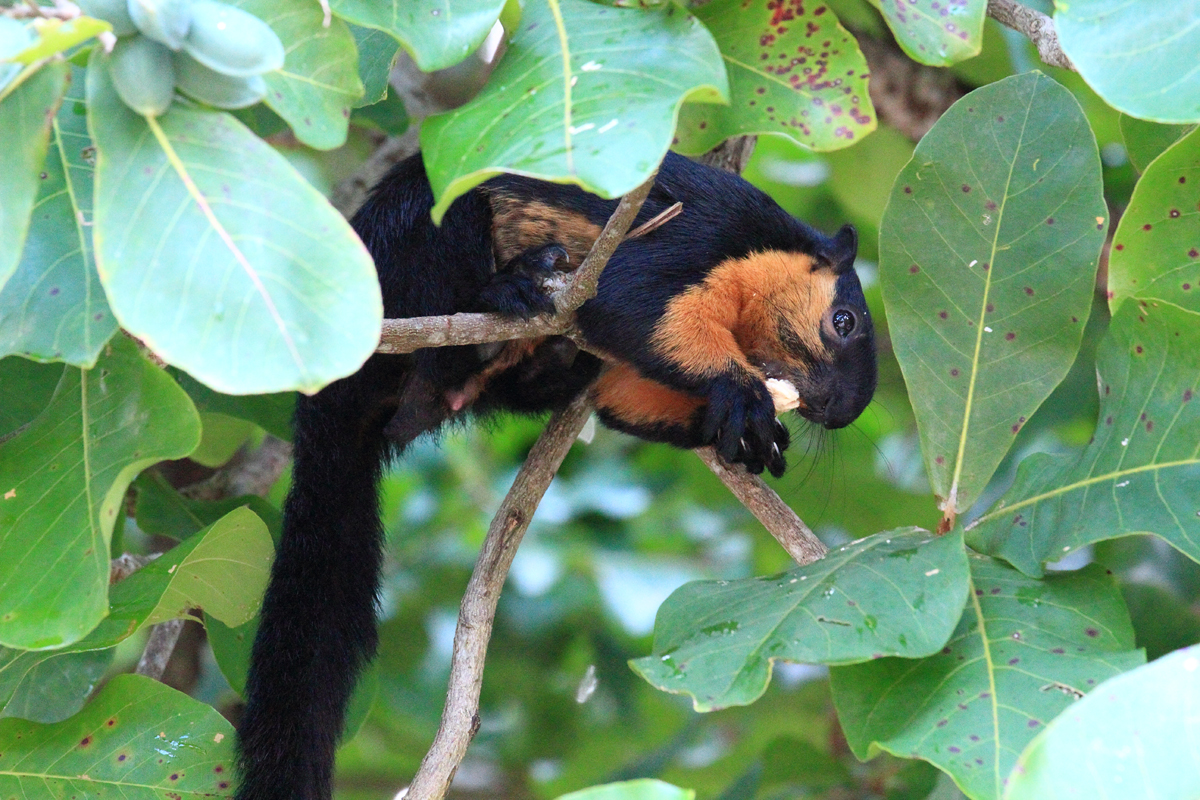
A black giant squirrel from Langkawi, Malaysia, showing the deeper colour of the underparts of individuals from small islands in this region

The black giant squirrel is one of the largest species of squirrel in the world. On average, an adult black giant squirrel weighs around 1.05–1.25 kg (2.3–2.8 lb), has a head–and–body length of 34–37 cm (13–15 in), and the tail is 41–42 cm (16–17 in) long. The subspecies R. b. condorensis of Vietnam's Côn Sơn Island averages only c. 30 cm (12 in) in head–and–body length and the tail 32 cm (13 in), but otherwise it resembles the typical subspecies.

This species is typically distinctly bicoloured with dark upperparts and pale underparts. The back, top of the head, ears and bushy tail are deep brown to black and the underparts are light buff-coloured. In Sumatra, Java and Bali the hairs of the back and tail are light-tipped, making these sections appear relatively pale (however, the upperparts, especially the thighs and shoulders, are still distinctly darker than the underparts). On small islands off Myanmar and in the Strait of Malacca, the black giant squirrel has orange to reddish-yellowish underparts.

== Habitat ==
Ratufa bicolor's range includes a variety of bioregions that all share the commonality of being forested. It ranges in elevation from sea level up to at least 2,500 m (8,200 ft). In recent decades, R. bicolor's habitat has been steadily encroached upon by human settlement, timber harvesting and agriculture, which along with overhunting by human predation in parts of its range, has resulted in a total loss of up to 30% of the population in the past ten years. In some places this species is protected from hunting by law or tradition.

In South Asia, R. bicolor dwells in tropical and subtropical coniferous and broadleaf forests.

In Southeast Asia, R. bicolor lives in tropical broadleaf evergreen and semi-evergreen forests, but is rarely seen in coniferous forests.

In the tropical rainforest of the Malay Peninsula and Indonesia, R. bicolor is not as abundant as elsewhere in its range, which is probably due to competition from other arboreal species (especially primates) for food in the upper forest canopy.

Among the better places to sight the black giant squirrel is the Kaziranga National Park in the state of Assam, India. Several populations are present in the lower range of the Neora Valley National Park, Kalimpong, India.

A recent study from India showed precipitation during the wettest month of a year is one of the major contributing factor for habitat preference of R. bicolor, along with land use, and vegetation. The species also may be found way beyond 1400 meters in several places. More than 20% of the presence records of the species has been observed above 1500 meters and up to 2700 meters in India. It has been predicted through study that by the year 2050, this species may loose more than 97% of its present suitable habitat due to climate change in India.

== Behavior ==
R. bicolor is diurnal and arboreal, but sometimes climbs down from the forest canopy to feed on the ground. The black giant squirrel rarely enters plantations or settlements, preferring the wild forest.

Its diet consists of seeds, pine cones, fruits, and leaves. It is primarily solitary, and has a litter of from 1 to 2 young, which it raises in a drey (or nest), often located within a hollow space of a tree.

== Taxonomy ==
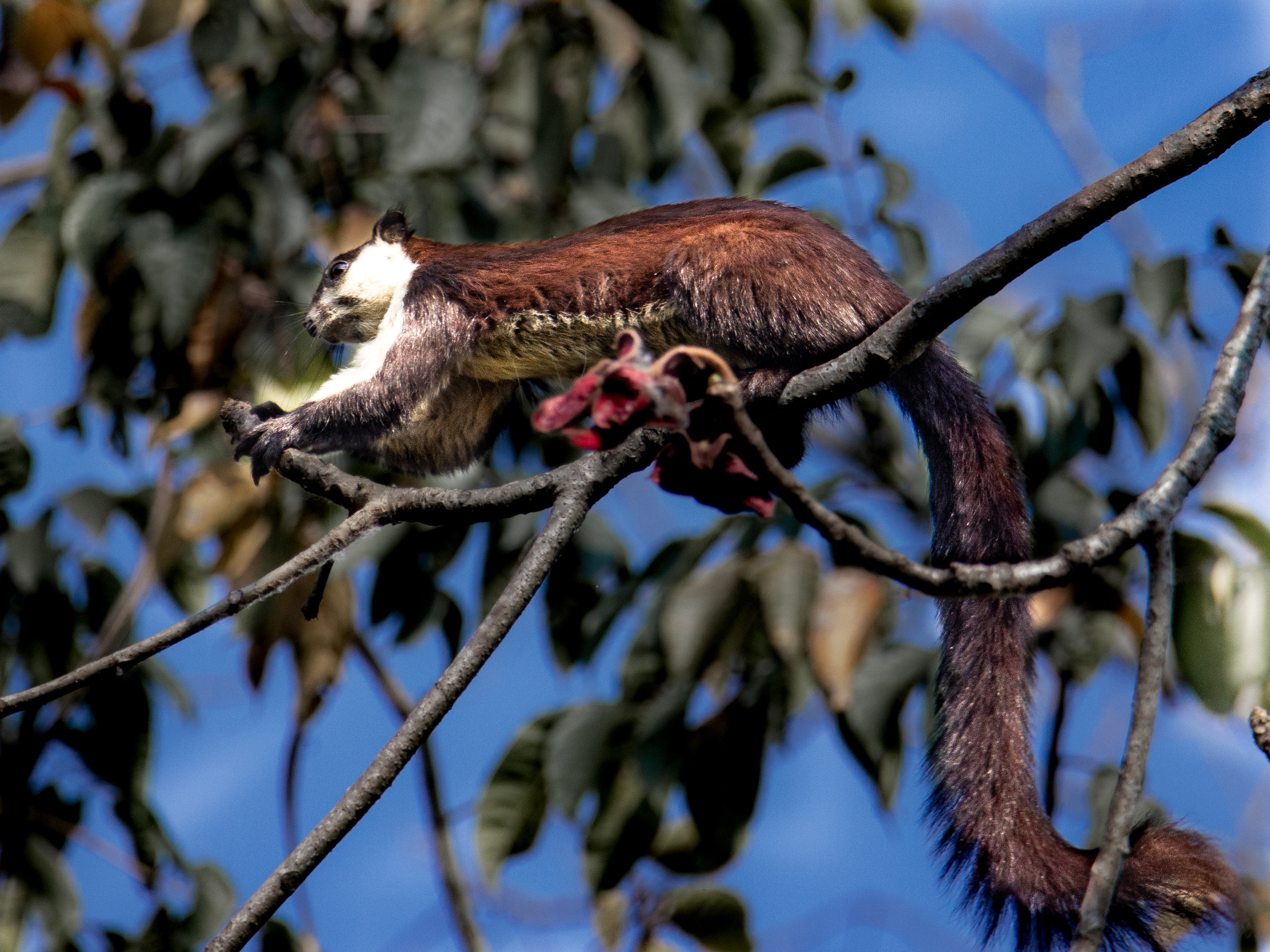
R. b. gigantea in Nameri National Park, Arunachal Pradesh, India

Further study is required to determine whether Ratufa bicolor actually represents several similar species.

The table below lists the ten recognized subspecies of Ratufa bicolor, along with any synonyms associated with each subspecies:

Ratufa bicolor taxonomy
Subspecies	Authority	Synonyms
R. b. bicolor	Sparrman (1778)	albiceps, baliensis, humeralis, javensis, leschnaultii, major, sondaica
R. b. condorensis	Kloss (1920)	none
R. b. felli	Thomas and Wroughton (1916)	none
R. b. gigantea	McClelland (1839)	lutrina, macruroides
R. b. hainana	J. A. Allen (1906)	stigmosa
R. b. leucogenys	Kloss (1916)	sinus
R. b. melanopepla	Miller (1900)	anambae, angusticeps, dicolorata, fretensis, penangensis, peninsulae, tiomanensis
R. b. palliata	Miller (1902)	batuana, laenata
R. b. phaeopepla	Miller (1913)	celaenopepla, marana
R. b. smithi	Robinson and Kloss (1922)	none

== Gallery ==
From Kaeng Krachan National Park, Thailand

== Bibliography ==
- Francis, Charles M., Priscilla Barrett. A field guide to the mammals of South-East Asia. London: New Holland, 2008. ISBN 978-1-84537-735-9, OCLC: 190967851.
- Lekhakun, Bunsong, Jeffrey A. McNeely. Mammals of Thailand. Bangkok: Association for the Conservation of Wildlife, 1977. OCLC: 3953763.
- Nowak, Ronald M. Walker's mammals of the world. Baltimore: Johns Hopkins University Press, 1999. ISBN 978-0-8018-5789-8, OCLC: 39045218. Chapter: "Sciuridae: squirrels, chipmunks, marmots, and prairie dogs" in volume two.
