= National Vegetation Classification =

National Vegetation Classification may refer to:

- British National Vegetation Classification (NVC)
- U.S. National Vegetation Classification (NVC or USNVC)
