= Phytotope =

Phytotope refers to the total habitat available for colonization by plants within a specific biotope, such as a forest, meadow, wetland, or urban green space. The term is primarily used in ecology to describe the portion of an environment that can support plant life, taking into account factors such as soil type, climate, light availability, and water conditions.

The word originates from the Greek roots phyto- meaning "plant" and -topos meaning "place." In ecological studies, the phytotope is often used alongside related concepts such as zootope (habitat available to animals) and microhabitat to describe the diversity of life-supporting conditions in a particular environment.

== Ecological Significance ==
Understanding the phytotope of a region is essential for evaluating its plant biodiversity and for conservation planning. It defines the range of ecological niches available to plants and is influenced by both abiotic factors (e.g., pH, salinity, temperature, disturbance) and biotic interactions (e.g., competition, herbivory, symbiosis). Different phytotopes within the same biotope may support distinct plant communities, contributing to habitat heterogeneity and species richness.

For example, within a forest biotope, the canopy, understory, forest floor, and clearings each represent distinct phytotopes with different environmental conditions and species compositions.

== Applications ==
Ecological restoration: Identifying the phytotopes of a degraded area can help in selecting appropriate native plant species for revegetation.

Landscape ecology: Phytotopes are used to analyze vegetation patterns across fragmented habitats or urban ecosystems.

Biodiversity assessments: Phytotopes are essential units in mapping plant distributions and evaluating conservation priorities.

== See also ==
- Ecological land classification
