= Zootope =

Zootope is the total habitat available for colonisation within any certain ecotope or biotope by animal life. The community of animals so established constitutes the zoocoenosis of that ecotope.

All these words (ecotope, biotope, zootope and others) describe environmental niches at very small scales of consideration. The rabbits and squirrels and mosquitoes of any suburban garden or village park, or the deer and wolves and birds of a wilderness ravine would each be deserving of the label.

== See also ==
- Ecological land classification
