= Ecosystem structure =

Spatial arrangement and interrelationships of components within an ecosystem

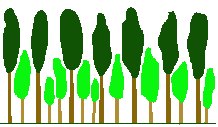
Vertical structure of tree density in a forest ecosystem

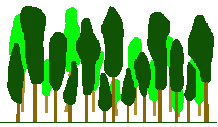
Horizontal structure of tree density in a forest ecosystem

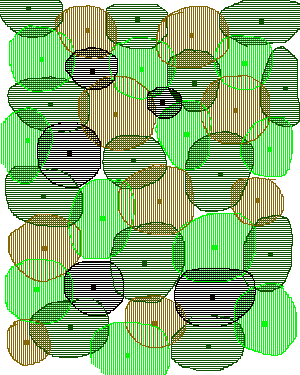
Diagram illustrating varying tree density in a forest

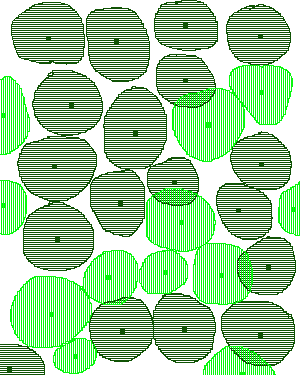
Diagram showing tree arrangement in a forest ecosystem

Ecosystem structure refers to the spatial arrangement and interrelationships among the components of an ecosystem, a specific type of system.

The smallest units of an ecosystem are individual organisms of various species. These species occupy specific ecological niches, defined by a complete set of abiotic components and biotic factors (e.g., biological interactions, intraspecific competition, and herd dynamics). Populations of different species coexisting in the same area form a biocoenosis, which depends on and shapes its habitat, creating a biotope. The biocoenosis-biotope system evolves toward a climax community, achieving ecological balance with an optimal structure in terms of species composition, population size, and spatial distribution. A balanced ecosystem functions as a closed system (closed ecological system), where matter cycles through the influx of external energy, typically from solar radiation (photosynthesis), and is dissipated as heat.

Ecosystem structure undergoes gradual transformations. If external conditions change slowly, the system adapts through evolutionary biological adaptation. Such transformations have occurred throughout Earth's history, driven by processes like the slow continental drift across climate zones. Rapid changes, whether local (e.g., due to large-scale wildfires or other natural disasters) or global (e.g., triggered by impact events), can lead to ecosystem destruction. Human-induced changes, such as the construction of hydraulic structures, highways, or pollution of water and soil, occur too quickly for natural ecological succession to adapt.

== System ==
A system (from Greek: σύστημα systema, meaning "composite thing") is an arrangement of elements interconnected by relationships that form its structure. These specific relationships enable the system to perform a higher-order function. The complexity of a system is determined by the number of components and the type and number of relationships among them, which dictate the possible states the system can assume.

An ecosystem is a system comprising living organisms that are mutually dependent (biocoenosis) and reliant on non-living components (biotope). The characteristic interactions distinguish ecosystems from "biotic systems" – segments of the biosphere where organisms of different species coexist but lack the specific network of relationships necessary for a stable, closed system.

In systems with few, randomly selected components (e.g., an aquarium or orangery), achieving ecological balance is unlikely. The first attempt to create and operate a large, multi-species artificial ecosystem, Biosphere 2, was undertaken in Arizona in the 1980s with eight people for two years. Similar studies continue on a smaller scale, particularly for U.S. space exploration plans, such as Mars bases.

== Overview of the biosphere and ecology ==
Diagram shows layers formed by intermolecular interactions: 1 – lipid bilayer, 2 – single layer; P, U – liquids of differing polarity

=== History of the biosphere ===
The Earth formed approximately 4.5 billion years ago during the Solar System's creation through the gravitational collapse of a molecular cloud, likely triggered by a nearby supernova. The shockwave caused the cloud to contract, mixing supernova material with the cloud's matter, enriching it with atoms formed only in supernova explosions. These atoms of chemical elements – components of the former star's chemical structure – and the resulting molecules of compounds remain the fundamental building blocks of Earth's matter, both living and non-living. The birth of Earth's biosphere was the emergence of life – the first organisms – and its current structure developed through numerous changes. These transformations occurred gradually through evolution and abruptly due to events like impact events during the final phase of accretion of planetesimals and the protoplanetary disk onto the young Earth's surface. Early organisms likely exhibited "cooperation", described as "selfish altruism" by Peter Kropotkin (1842–1921). A significant outcome of such interactions among unicellular organisms, as proposed by Lynn Margulis (1938–2011), was the emergence of eukaryotes with mitochondria and plastids through symbiogenesis.

Increasing species diversity – taxonomic differentiation – and organism abundance likely intensified the role of Darwinian "struggle for existence", consistent with evolution and natural selection principles.

The number and taxonomic diversity of Earth's organisms have been repeatedly reduced by events such as changes in atmospheric composition (e.g., the rise of oxygen from photosynthesis), sea level changes, continental merging or breakup, lava flows, and asteroid impacts. Numerous mass extinctions in Earth's history destroyed existing ecosystems, leading to new interspecies dependencies among surviving species and those emerging in new conditions.

=== Modern biosphere and ecology ===
The modern biosphere is one of the most complex and least understood systems. The number of species within it remains a subject of research and debate, estimated at 5–50 million, with some sources suggesting approximately 8.7 million (±1.3 million). According to T.L. Erwin's rough estimates (1982), arthropods in tropical rainforests alone may represent 30 million species. Among known species, animals dominate with approximately 1.03 million identified, including 751,000 insects and 42,300 vertebrates. Approximately 248,400 plant species are known, including 170,000 dicotyledons. The number of undescribed species likely far exceeds those documented, and the number of microorganisms remains largely unknown, with only 2–3% of taxonomists studying them.

The structure of this complex system is the focus of ecology. The term was coined by Ernst Haeckel in 1869. Defining its scope and objectives has proven challenging. In 1927, Charles Sutherland Elton described it as the "science of natural history". Similarly, Eugene Odum (1963) defined ecology as the "science of the structure and functioning of nature". Herbert Andrewartha (1961) refined this, stating:

Ecology is the science of the distribution and abundance of organisms.

Charles Krebs further clarified, emphasizing the causes of distribution and abundance:

Ecology is the science of the interactions determining the abundance and distribution of organisms.

== Types of ecosystem control systems ==
To address where organisms occur and in what numbers, it is assumed that the biosphere system comprises numerous subsystems – smaller ecosystems with varied sizes and structures, easier to describe formally (enabling mathematical modeling). Each subsystem consists of two primary components:

- Biocoenosis – the set of all populations inhabiting a habitat.
- Biotope – all abiotic factors (e.g., soil type, access to water resources, insolation).

Within each ecosystem, matter cycles through external energy input. In a balanced ecosystem, the same amount of energy is released to the environment after flowing through the system. Regulation of these processes, tied to changes in population abundance and distribution, is facilitated by three overlapping structural types of biocoenosis:

- First-order structure (trophic) – food-based relationships (based on Elton's concept of "structural elements"), forming food chains, food webs, and ecological pyramids.
- Second-order structure (competitive) – occurring within complex biocenoses where species with similar dietary needs compete.
- Third-order structure (paratrophic) – non-exploitative food relationships where the donor's resources are not depleted (e.g., melitophagy, allelopathy).

== Organisms and populations ==
Ecosystem structure's smallest elements are individual living organisms, ranging from unicellular organisms to multicellular colonies and highly organized organisms. Explaining organism-environment relationships (other organisms and biotope) was traditionally part of autecology, now encompassed by species ecology. Studies of anatomy, physiology, and genetic traits are relevant only to the extent needed to understand an organism's relationship with its environment, such as defining its ecological niche, mechanisms of forming larger groups (e.g., plant formations, communities, herds), geographic range, or the role of energy balance in the energy economy of larger organism groups.

The next level of ecosystem organization is the population, defined as a group of organisms of the same species within a biocoenosis occupying a specific biotope. Key characteristics of a population's ecological structure, observed in natural or laboratory settings, include:

- Abundance, fertility, reproduction rate, mortality, survivorship curve.
- Population density and its temporal variation.
- Spatial structure, e.g., uniform, linear, or clumped distribution, vertical structure.
- Age and sex structure.
- Social structure (e.g., social insects, parabiosis, herd, social systems of birds, African buffalo, tigers, sociology).
- Population dynamics.
- Population energetics.

Ranges of ecological tolerance for an eurybiont (A) and stenobionts (B, C, D) in response to changes in environmental factor X; Y – measure of tolerance (e.g., number of individuals, density)

== Biocenoses and ecosystems ==
Biocenoses are biotic systems comprising multiple populations coexisting in one biotope, forming an ecosystem. Biocenoses are distinguished based on several criteria, ideally characterized by:

- A specific species composition with relatively stable population sizes, adapted to habitat conditions and prevalent in a given landscape.
- A complete composition for matter and energy cycling.
- High durability (longevity).
- Definable boundaries, based on species composition or environmental factor analysis.

These criteria are not absolute, as these systems undergo natural changes over time and space, such as seasonal shifts, the introduction of invasive species or introduced species, or long-term ecological succession processes. For example, succession may begin with pioneer species colonizing a barren environment (e.g., a newly formed island), gradually altering the habitat (e.g., through soil formation) to enable colonization by subsequent species and the establishment of interspecies relationships. Succession concludes with a climax community – a relatively stable biocoenosis and ecosystem structure.

Due to the often unclear boundaries between ecosystems, the concept of an ecotone – a typically species-rich transitional zone of varying width (e.g., between tundra and taiga, coastline, forest edge, or field margin) – is used.

The abundance and distribution of each population in an ecosystem are determined by species traits, biotope characteristics, and interactions with other populations. These interactions include:

- Non-antagonistic – symbiosis (mutualism, protocooperation), commensalism.
- Antagonistic – competition, parasitism, predation, allelopathy, amensalism.

Neutralism – the absence of interactions – is rare. Strong antagonistic interactions involve population exploitation, including human exploitation of nature.

=== Food chains and food webs ===
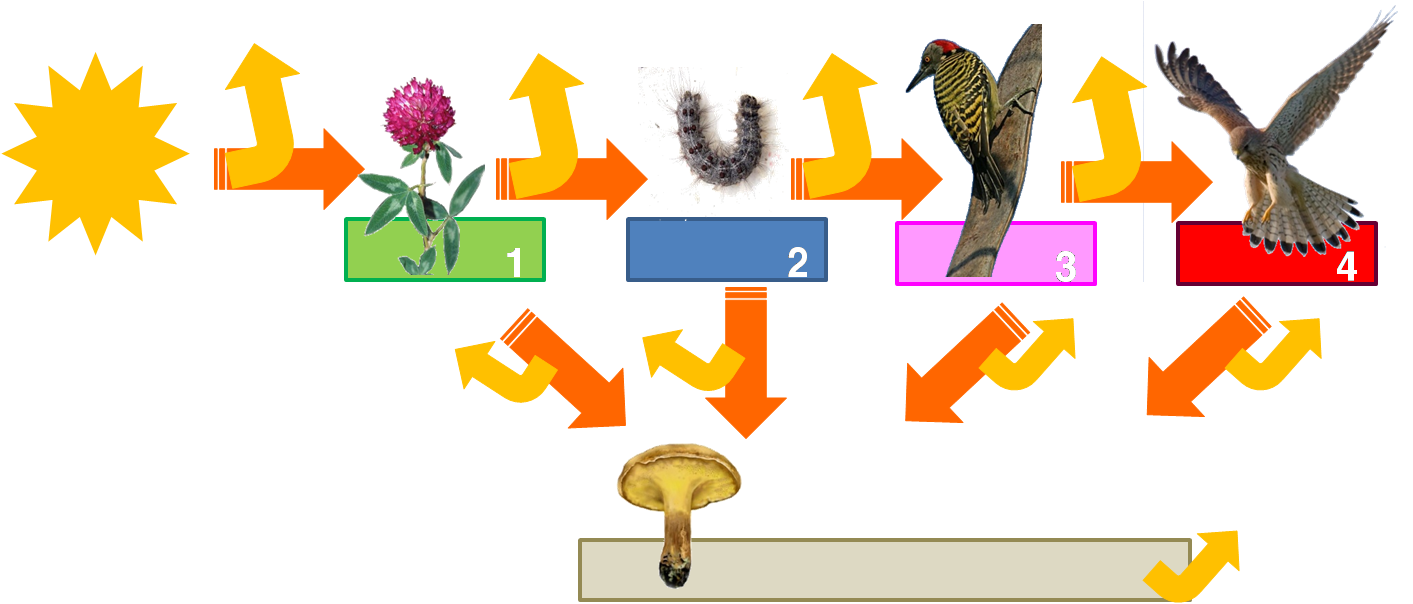
Schematic of energy flow in a food chain

The first link in every food chain consists of autotrophic populations, essential to all ecosystems. These organisms produce organic compounds from inorganic ones using external energy, primarily solar radiation (photoautotrophs, photosynthetic organisms) or chemical reaction energy (chemoautotrophs, e.g., producers in hydrothermal vent ecosystems). The rate of biomass production (primary net productivity) depends on the total energy converted by plants into chemical energy (biomass, A – assimilation) minus their own "maintenance costs" (R – respiration). The difference (P = A – R) is the net productivity. In a simple food chain, part of this biomass increment feeds primary consumers (e.g., larvae of the European peacock butterfly). For these consumers, consumed energy (C) is partly used for maintenance, partly for biomass growth, and partly excreted (fecal matter, FU). This energy partitioning continues through subsequent food chain links (e.g., peacock butterfly larvae → great tit (primary predator) → domestic cat (secondary predator)). Waste and detritus from each link are energy sources for decomposers, closing the matter cycle by breaking down organic matter into inorganic compounds.

In real ecosystems, energy transfer pathways are more complex. Resources from producers are used not only by primary consumers, and top predators may feed on multiple lower trophic levels. Complex biocenoses with many populations are characterized by intricate food webs. High biodiversity ensures that the removal of a species exceeding its tolerance range does not permanently disrupt energy flow, as alternative pathways become more active.

=== Ecological pyramids ===
Ecological pyramids describe abundance, productivity, and biomass at various trophic levels:

- Level 1: Producers (autotrophs).
- Level 2: Primary consumers (herbivores, phytophages).
- Level 3: Secondary consumers (primary predators).
- Level 4: Tertiary consumers (secondary predators).

In simpler ecosystems (e.g., agrocenosis), level 4 may be absent, while complex ecosystems may include higher levels.

In productivity pyramids (energy), the first level is always the largest, proportional to the energy producers capture externally, used directly in their life processes or stored as biomass for herbivores and saprotrophs. Subsequent layers reflect the energy taken from the lower level (total consumption by all populations at that level). Biomass and abundance pyramids may be inverted, as herbivores can derive the same energy from numerous, fast-growing phytoplankton with low total mass or from fewer, slow-growing trees with high mass.

== Higher levels of biosphere organization ==
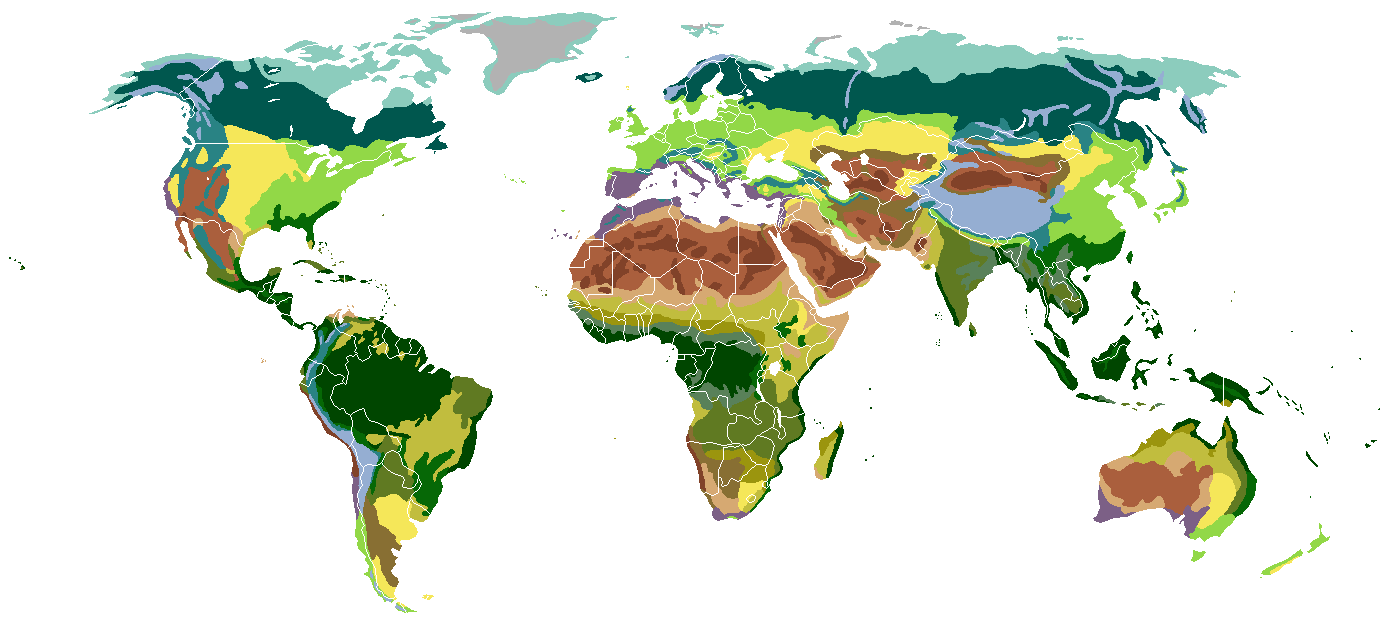
Biomes of Earth Ice caps and polar deserts Tundra Taiga Temperate deciduous forest Steppe Subtropical rainforest Mediterranean vegetation Monsoon forests Barren deserts Dry vegetation Dry steppe Semi-arid deserts Grass savanna Tree savanna Subtropical dry forest Tropical forests Alpine tundra Mountain forests

Higher levels of biosphere organization include:

- Landscape.
- Biomes.
- Biogeographic realms – zoogeographic realms and phytogeographic realms.

== Practical applications of ecosystem structure knowledge ==
Knowledge of ecosystem structures and dynamics is applied in:

- Management of natural resources, e.g., agriculture, forestry, hunting, fisheries (basis for rational population exploitation).
- Nature conservation.
- Environmental protection for human environments.

Effective biosphere and ecosystem protection requires:

- Spatial planning on a global scale to protect globally significant ecosystems.
- Protection of biodiversity, including species diversity.
- Establishing rules and limits for human intervention in nature to maintain ecosystem dynamics.
- Efforts to reduce human impacts on abiotic environmental components.

== Bibliography ==
- Krebs, Charles J. (2011). Ekologia. Eksperymentalna analiza rozmieszczenia i liczebności [Ecology: The Experimental Analysis of Distribution and Abundance] (in Polish). Translated by Kozakiewicz, Anna; Kozakiewicz, Michał; Szacki, Jakub (4th ed.). Warsaw: Wydawnictwo Naukowe PWN. ISBN 978-83-01-16552-9.
- Weiner, January (2003). Życie i ewolucja biosfery. Podręcznik ekologii ogólnej [Life and Evolution of the Biosphere: A General Ecology Textbook] (in Polish). Warsaw: Wydawnictwo Naukowe PWN. ISBN 83-01-14047-X.
- Trojan, Przemysław (1985). Ekologia ogólna [General Ecology] (in Polish). Warsaw: Państwowe Wydawnictwo Naukowe. ISBN 83-01-02275-2.
