= Vegetation =

Assemblage of plant species

These maps show a scale, or index of greenness, based on several factors: the number and type of plants, leafiness, and plant health. Where foliage is dense and plants are growing quickly, the index is high, represented in dark green. Regions with sparse vegetation and a low vegetation index are shown in tan. Based on measurements from the Moderate Resolution Imaging Spectroradiometer (MODIS) on NASA's Terra satellite. Areas where there is no data are gray.

Vegetation is an assemblage of plants and the ground cover they provide. It is a general term, without specific reference to particular taxa, life forms, structure, spatial extent, or any other specific botanical or geographic characteristics. It is broader than the term flora which refers to species composition. Perhaps the closest synonym is plant community, but "vegetation" can, and often does, refer to a wider range of spatial scales than that term does, including scales as large as the global. Primeval redwood forests, coastal mangrove stands, sphagnums, desert soil crusts, roadside weed patches, wheat fields, cultivated gardens and lawns; all are encompassed by the term "vegetation".

The vegetation type is defined by characteristic dominant species, or a common aspect of the assemblage, such as an elevation range or environmental commonality. The contemporary use of "vegetation" approximates that of ecologist Frederic Clements' term earth cover, an expression still used by the Bureau of Land Management.

== History of definition ==
The distinction between vegetation (the general appearance of a community) and flora (the taxonomic composition of a community) was first made by Jules Thurmann (1849). Prior to this, the two terms (vegetation and flora) were used indiscriminately, and still are in some contexts. Augustin de Candolle (1820) also made a similar distinction but he used the terms "station" (habitat type) and "habitation" (botanical region). Later, the concept of vegetation would influence the usage of the term biome with the inclusion of the animal element.

Other concepts similar to vegetation are "physiognomy of vegetation" (Humboldt, 1805, 1807) and "formation" (Grisebach, 1838, derived from "Vegetationsform", Martius, 1824).

Departing from Linnean taxonomy, Humboldt established a new science, dividing plant geography between taxonomists who studied plants as taxa and geographers who studied plants as vegetation. The physiognomic approach in the study of vegetation is common among biogeographers working on vegetation on a world scale, or when there is a lack of taxonomic knowledge of someplace (e.g., in the tropics, where biodiversity is commonly high).

The concept of "vegetation type" is more ambiguous. The definition of a specific vegetation type may include not only physiognomy but also floristic and habitat aspects. Furthermore, the phytosociological approach in the study of vegetation relies upon a fundamental unit, the plant association, which is defined upon flora.

An influential, clear and simple classification scheme for types of vegetation was produced by Wagner & von Sydow (1888). Other important works with a physiognomic approach includes Grisebach (1872), Warming (1895, 1909), Schimper (1898), Tansley and Chipp (1926), Rübel (1930), Burtt Davy (1938), Beard (1944, 1955), André Aubréville (1956, 1957), Trochain (1955, 1957), Küchler (1967), Ellenberg and Mueller-Dombois (1967) (see vegetation classification).

== Classifications ==
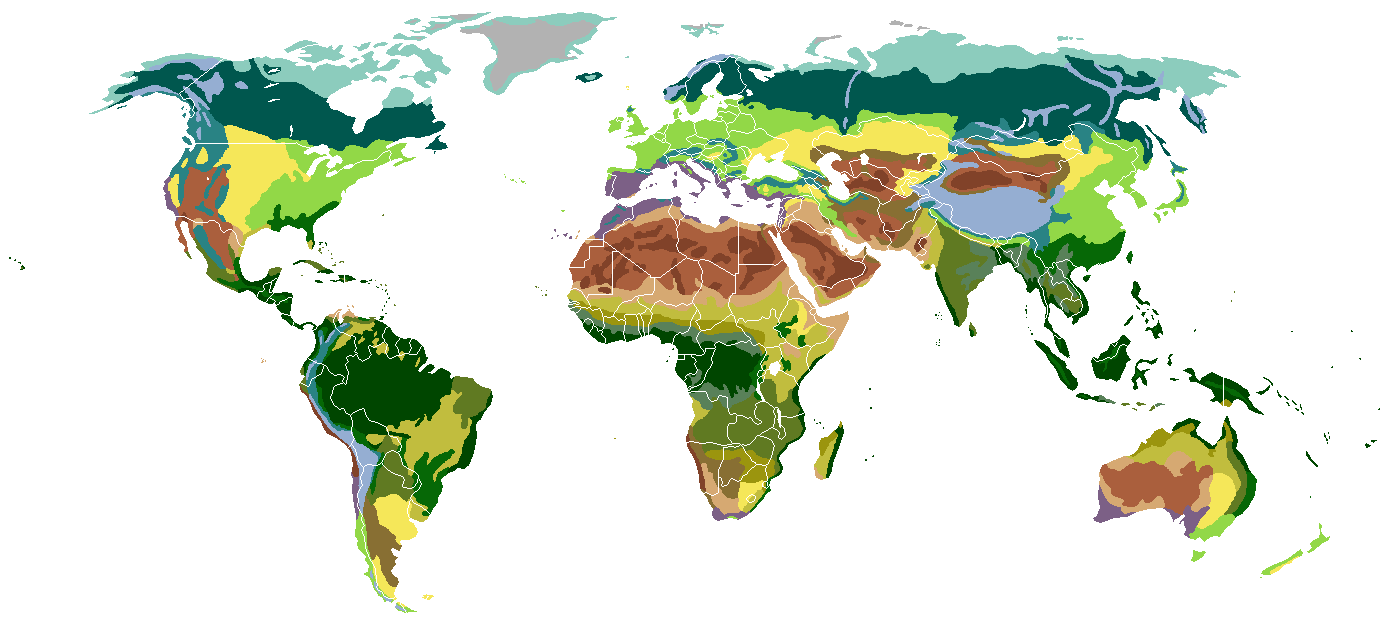
Biomes classified by vegetation Tundra Taiga Temperate broadleaf and mixed forest Temperate grasslands Subtropical moist forest Mediterranean Monsoon forest Desert Xeric shrubland Dry steppe Semi-desert Grass savanna Tree savanna Tropical and subtropical dry forest Tropical rainforest Alpine tundra Montane forest

There are many approaches for the classification of vegetation (physiognomy, flora, ecology, etc.). Much of the work on vegetation classification comes from European and North American ecologists, and they have fundamentally different approaches. In North America, vegetation types are based on a combination of the following criteria: climate pattern, plant habit, phenology and/or growth form, and dominant species. In the current US standard (adopted by the Federal Geographic Data Committee (FGDC), and originally developed by UNESCO and The Nature Conservancy), the classification is hierarchical and incorporates the non-floristic criteria into the upper (most general) five levels and limited floristic criteria only into the lower (most specific) two levels. In Europe, classification often relies much more heavily, sometimes entirely, on floristic (species) composition alone, without explicit reference to climate, phenology or growth forms. It often emphasizes indicator or diagnostic species which may distinguish one classification from another.

In the FGDC standard, the hierarchy levels, from most general to most specific, are: system, class, subclass, group, formation, alliance, and association. The lowest level, or association, is thus the most precisely defined, and incorporates the names of the dominant one to three (usually two) species of a type. An example of a vegetation type defined at the level of class might be "Forest, canopy cover > 60%"; at the level of a formation as "Winter-rain, broad-leaved, evergreen, sclerophyllous, closed-canopy forest"; at the level of alliance as "Arbutus menziesii forest"; and at the level of association as "Arbutus menziesii-Lithocarpus dense flora forest", referring to Pacific madrone-tanoak forests which occur in California and Oregon, US. In practice, the levels of the alliance and/or an association are the most often used, particularly in vegetation mapping, just as the Latin binomial is most often used in discussing particular species in taxonomy and in general communication.

== Dynamics ==
Like all biological systems, plant communities are temporally and spatially dynamic; they change at all possible scales. Dynamism in vegetation is defined primarily as changes in species composition and structure.

=== Temporal dynamics ===
Vegetation types at the time of Last Glacial Maximum

Temporally, many processes or events can cause change, but for the sake of simplicity, they can be categorized roughly as abrupt or gradual. Abrupt changes are generally referred to as disturbances; these include things like wildfires, high winds, landslides, floods, avalanches and the like. Their causes are usually external (exogenous) to the community—they are natural processes occurring (mostly) independently of the natural processes of the community (such as germination, growth, death, etc.). Such events can change vegetation structure and composition very quickly and for long periods, and they can do so over large areas. Very few ecosystems are without some disturbance as a regular and recurring part of the long-term system dynamic. Fire and wind disturbances are prevalent throughout many vegetation types worldwide. Fire is particularly potent because of its ability to destroy not only living plants but also the seeds, spores, and living meristems representing the potential next generation, and because of fire's impact on fauna populations, soil characteristics and other ecosystem elements and processes (for further discussion of this topic see fire ecology).

Temporal change at a slower pace is ubiquitous; it comprises the ecological succession field. Succession is the relatively gradual structure and taxonomic composition change that arises as the vegetation modifies various environmental variables over time, including light, water, and nutrient levels. These modifications change the suite of species most adapted to grow, survive, and reproduce in an area, causing floristic changes. These floristic changes contribute to structural changes inherent in plant growth even in the absence of species changes (especially where plants have a large maximum size, i.e., trees), causing slow and broadly predictable changes in the vegetation. Succession can be interrupted at any time by disturbance, setting the system back to a previous state or off on another trajectory altogether. Because of this, successional processes may or may not lead to some static, final state. Moreover, accurately predicting the characteristics of such a state, even if it does arise, is not always possible. In short, vegetative communities are subject to many variables that set limits on future conditions' predictability.

=== Spatial dynamics ===
Generally, the larger an area under consideration, the more likely the vegetation will be heterogeneous. Two main factors are at work. First, the temporal dynamics of disturbance and succession are increasingly unlikely to be in synchrony across any area as the size of that area increases. Different areas will be at various developmental stages due to other local histories, particularly their times since the last significant disturbance. This fact interacts with inherent environmental variability (e.g., in soils, climate, topography, etc.), also a function of area. Environmental variability constrains the suite of species that can occupy a given area, and the two factors interact to create a mosaic of vegetation conditions across the landscape. Only in agricultural or horticultural systems does vegetation ever approach perfect uniformity. There is always heterogeneity in natural systems, although its scale and intensity will vary widely.

== See also ==
- Biocoenosis
- Biome
- Ecological succession
- Ecoregion
- Ecosystem
- Plant cover
- Tropical vegetation
- Vegetation and slope stability
