= Evergreen forest =

Forest of evergreen trees

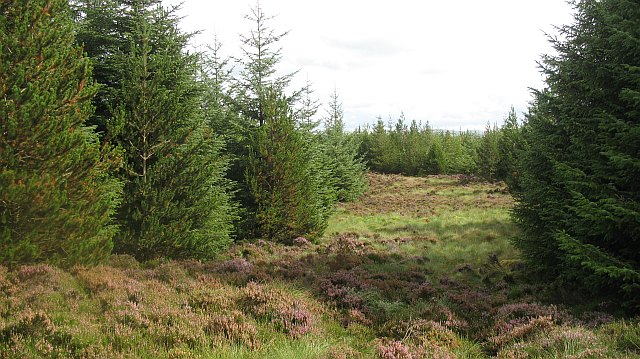

An evergreen forest is a forest made up of evergreen trees. They occur across a wide range of climatic zones, and include trees such as conifers and holly in cold climates, eucalyptus, live oak, acacias, magnolia, and banksia in more temperate zones, and rainforest trees in tropical zones.

== Species of trees ==
Coniferous temperate evergreen forests are most frequently dominated by species in the families. The trees include: Pinaceae and Cupressaceae. Broadleaf temperate evergreen forests include those in which Fagaceae, such as oaks and ferns are common, those in which Nothofagaceae predominate, and the eucalyptus forests of the Southern Hemisphere. There are assorted temperate evergreen forests dominated by other families of trees, such as Lauraceae in laurel forest.

== Climate Factor ==
Evergreen forests need a hot and wet climate with heavy annual rainfall above 200cm and steady temperature between 15°C and 30°C. These areas maintain high air humidity above 75% with no true dry season, which keeps the vegetation green all year.

Rainfall: Annual rainfall over 250cm per year.

Temperature: Stable warmth averaging 20-27°C.

Humidity: Average annual humidity exceeds 77%.

== Regions ==
Coniferous temperate evergreen forests are found largely in the temperate mid-latitudes of Siberia, Canada, Australia, Africa, Scandinavia, Indonesia, Malaysia, the Amazon and Orinoco basins of South America, the Eastern Hills (North-East Indian Region) of Himalayas and Western Region of Western Ghats and Andaman and Nicobar Islands of India. Broadleaf evergreen forests occur in particular in southern China, southeastern Brazil, parts of southeastern North America, and in countries around the Mediterranean Basin, such as Lebanon and Morocco. Other evergreen forests (or tropical rainforests) are usually found in areas receiving more than 234 cm (92 in) of rainfall and having a monthly mean temperature of 20 °C (68 °F) or higher in the coldest months. They occupy about seven percent of the Earth's surface and harbour more than half of the planet's terrestrial plants and animals. Tropical evergreen forests are dense, multi-layered, and harbour many types of plants and animals. These forests are found in the areas receiving heavy rainfall (more than 200 cm [79 in] of annual rainfall). They are very dense. Even the sunlight does not reach the ground. Numerous species of trees are found in these forests. In some regions, some types of trees shed their leaves at different times of the year. Therefore, these forests always appear green and are known as evergreen forests.

== See also ==
- Deciduous forest
- Biomes
- Ecoregion
- Ecological land classification
- List of terrestrial ecoregions (WWF)
- Temperate coniferous forest
