= U.S. National Vegetation Classification =

Classification scheme

The U.S. National Vegetation Classification (NVC or USNVC) is a scheme for classifying the natural and cultural vegetation communities of the United States. The purpose of this standardized vegetation classification system is to facilitate communication between land managers, scientists, and the public when managing, researching, and protecting plant communities.

The non-profit group NatureServe maintains the NVC for the U.S. government.

== See also ==
- British National Vegetation Classification
- Vegetation classification
