= Seral community =

Intermediate stage in ecological succession

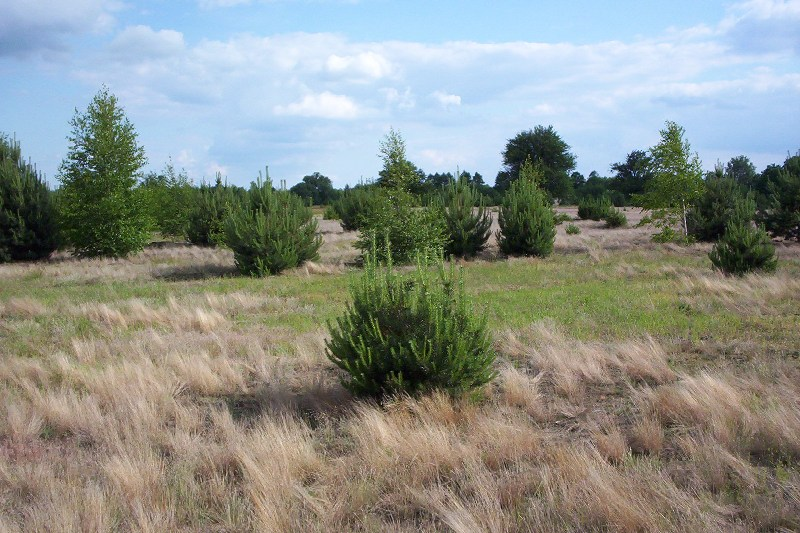
A seral community of shrubs and grasses on an abandoned field

A seral community is an intermediate stage found in ecological succession in an ecosystem advancing towards its climax community. In many cases more than one seral stage evolves until climax conditions are attained. A prisere is a collection of seres making up the development of an area from non-vegetated surfaces to a climax community.

A seral community is the name given to each group of plants within the succession. A primary succession describes those plant communities that occupy a site that has not previously been vegetated. These can also be described as the pioneer community. Computer modeling is sometimes used to evaluate likely succession stages in a seral community.

Depending on the substratum and climate, a seral community can be one of the following:

Hydrosere
Community in water
Lithosere
Community on rock
Psammosere
Community on sand
Xerosere
Community in dry area
Halosere
Community in saline body (e.g. a salt marsh)

== Examples ==
Seral communities in secondary succession can be seen in a recently logged coniferous forest. During the first two years, grasses, heaths and herbaceous plants such as fireweed will be abundant. After a few more years shrubs will start to appear; and about six to eight years after clearing, the area is likely to be crowded with young birches. Each of these stages can be referred to as a seral community.

In the far western part of North America, chaparral plant communities are typically controlled by periodic natural wildfires. In the southern portion of the Coast Ranges and in Southern California chaparral, toyon is often a locally dominant taxon in seral communities transitional between coastal sage scrub.

== See also ==
- Allogenic succession
- Autogenic succession
- Complex early seral forest
- Frederic Clements
- Plagioclimax
