= Psammosere =

Sequence of plant succession

A psammosere is the sequence of plant succession that has been initiated on sand.

A psammosere is an intermediate stage in ecological succession, known as a seral community, that begins life on newly exposed coastal sand. The most common psammoseres are sand dune systems. Psammosere is a form of xerosere succession, meaning it begins in an environment with limited to no freshwater availability.

== History ==
Psammosere's literal meaning is “originating on sand". It was named by Frederic E. Clements who described the sequence in Plant Succession 1916, although it had also been observed by Henry Chandler Cowles after he conducted several studies on the sand dunes surrounding Lake Michigan, which was influenced by the work of Eugenius Warming.

== Sand dune systems ==
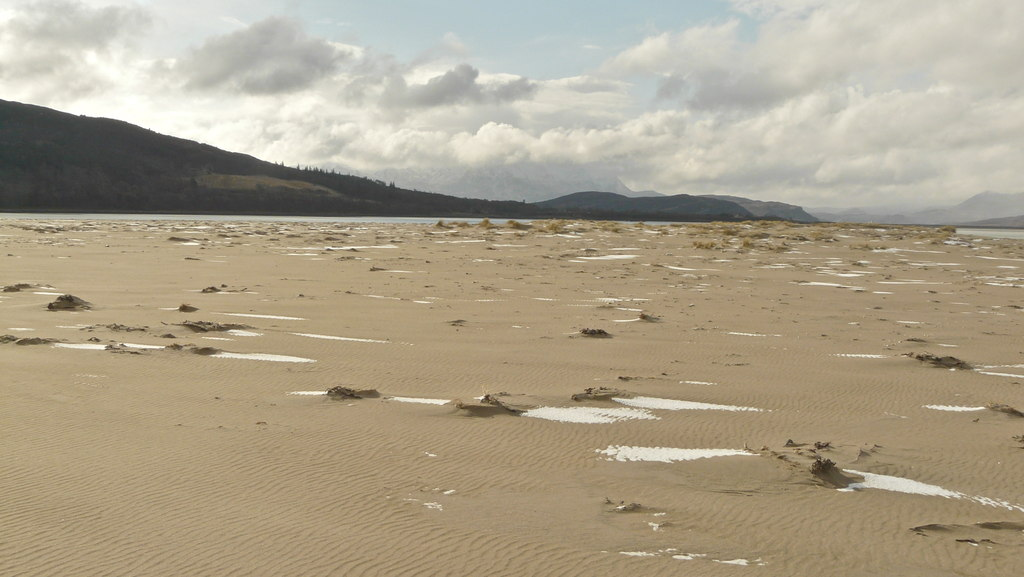
The first stage in a psammosere succession. Pioneer species can be seen forming embryo dunes

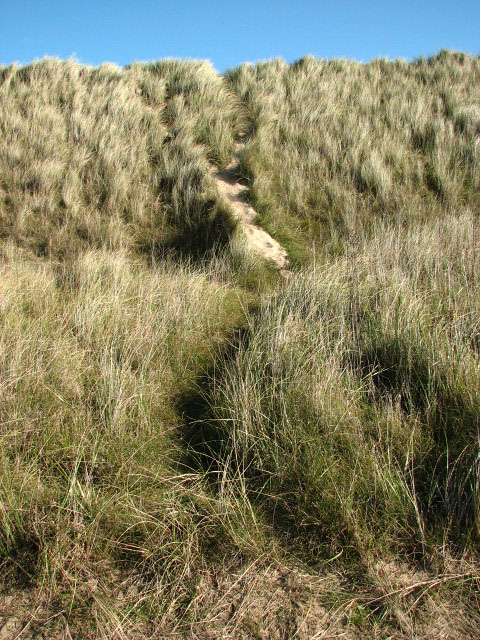
The second stage in a psammosere succession. Humans have trampled some of the grass in this area, making it more vulnerable to erosion.

In a psammosere, the organisms closest to the sea will be pioneer species: halophytes (salt-tolerant species) such as littoral algae and glasswort, with marram grass stabilising the dunes. Progressing inland, many characteristics of the ground change which helps determine the natural succession of the dunes.

For instance, the drainage slows down as the land becomes more compact and the soils improve in quality, and the pH drops as the proportion of seashell fragments reduces and the amount of humus increases. Sea purslane, sea lavender, meadow grass and heather eventually grade into a typical non-maritime ecosystem. The first trees (or pioneer trees) that appear are typically fast-growing trees such as pine, birch, willow or rowan. In turn these will be replaced by slow-growing, larger trees such as ash and oak. This is the climax community, defined as the point where a plant succession does not develop any further because it has reached equilibrium with the environment, in particular the climate.

The later stages of a psammosere appear when the sand stops moving due to lower wind speeds. These lower wind speeds can be because of distance from the shoreline or the formation of higher dunes, acting as windbreaks, or a combination of both of these factors. The process by which different stages succeed each other is known as "plant colonisation".

=== Effect on pH ===
In an idealised model of a coastal psammosere at the seaward edge of the sand dune, the pH of the soil is typically alkaline/neutral with a pH of 7.0/8.0 particularly where shell fragments provide a significant component of the sand. Further inland, the soil's pH decreases as the soil gets more acidic. Tracking inland across the dunes, a podsol develops with a pH of 5.0 – 4.0, followed by mature podsols at the climax with a pH of 3.5 – 4.5.

=== Human effects ===
Psammosere succession is also extremely vulnerable to human activities. At beaches, footpaths over dunes will trample grass, creating exposed sand. This exposed sand can be blown away very easily, leading to the roots becoming exposed and neighbouring plants dying. This creates blowouts, which can set back psammosere succession.

Efforts have also been made to improve the psammosere in some regards. In some areas, pine trees are an invasive species and can take over heathland. The National Trust in the UK encourages people to pull up small Pine trees as they can leave needles on the ground, which can prevent further psammosere succession through the dropping of needles.

== See also ==
- Halosere
- Hydrosere
- Lithosere
- Psamment
- Xerosere
