= Hydrosere =

Type of plant succession

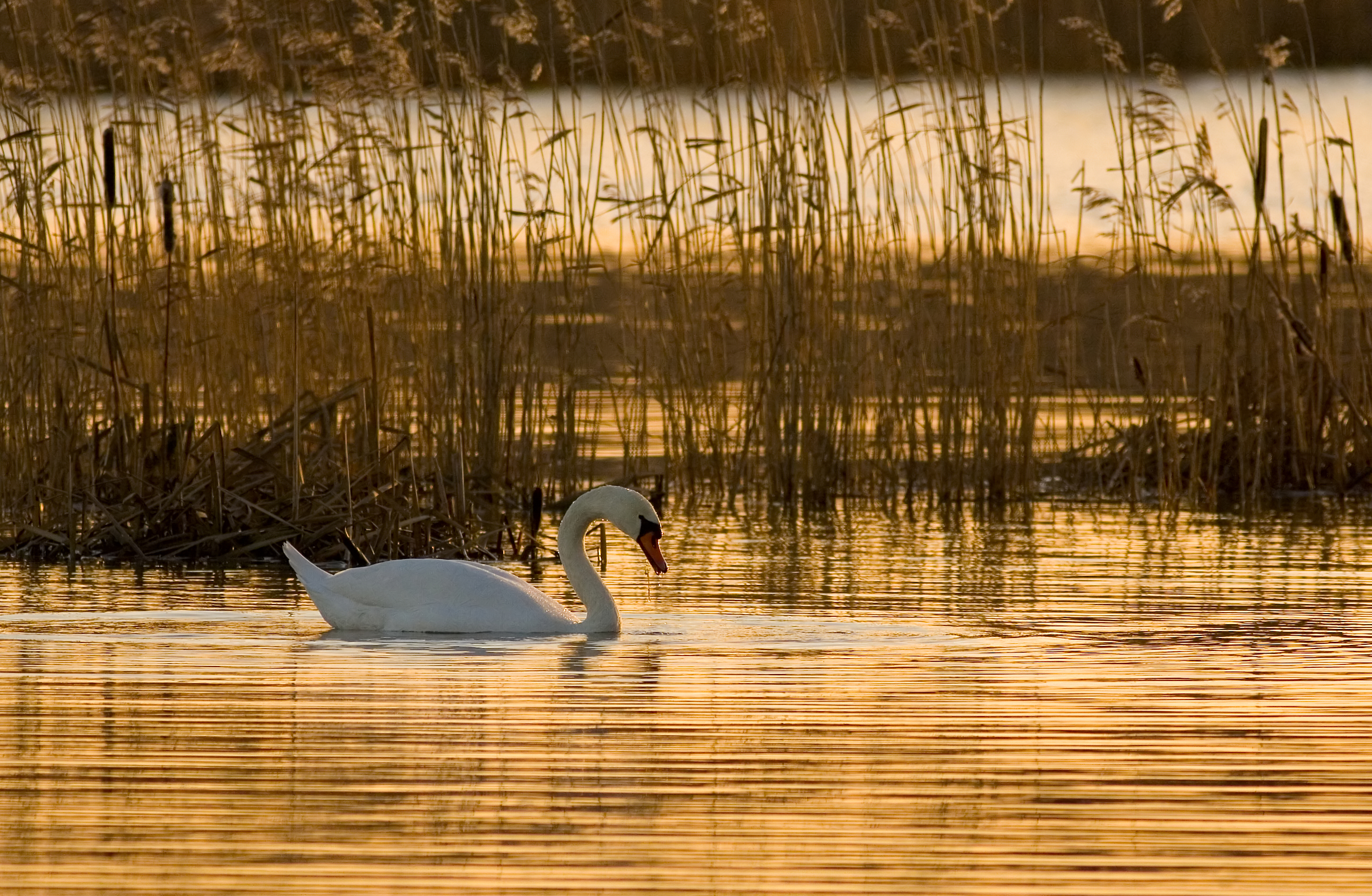
Mute swan (Cygnus olor) in a hydrosere community at sunrise.

A hydrosere is a plant succession which occurs in an area of fresh water such as in oxbow lakes and kettle lakes. In time, an area of open freshwater will naturally dry out, ultimately becoming woodland. During this change, a range of different landtypes such as swamp and marsh will succeed each other.

The succession from open water to climax woodland takes centuries or millennia. Some intermediate stages will last a shorter time than others. For example, swamp may change to marsh within a decade or less. How long it takes will depend largely on the amount of siltation occurring in the area of open water.

== Stages ==
Aquatic Succession or Hydrosere process

Hydrosere is the primary succession sequence which develops in aquatic environments such as lakes and ponds. It results in conversion of water body and its community into a land community. The early changes are allogenic as inorganic particles such as sand and clay are washed from catchment areas and begin filling the basin of the water body. Later, remains of dead plants also fill up these bodies and contribute to further changes in the environment.

If a water body is large and very deep, a strong wave action is at work, therefore in these bodies a noticeable change cannot easily be observed. However, in smaller water bodies such as a pond the succession is easily recognizable. Different plant communities occupy different zones in a water body and exhibit concentric zonation. The edges of the water body are occupied by rooted species, submerged species are found in the littoral zone and planktons and floating species occupy the open water zone.

There is nevertheless still debate about whether dry woodland is always the final climax community, or whether a watery, bog community can also be the final, stable, climax community.

=== Phytoplankton stage ===
Phytoplankton (cyanobacteria), green algae (Spirogyra, Oedogonium), diatoms, etc. are the pioneer colonizers in the initial stage of succession in a water body, such as a pond. Their spores are carried by air to the pond. The phytoplankton are followed by zooplankton. They settle down to the bottom of the pond after death, and decay into humus that mixes with silt and clay particles brought into the basin by run off water and wave action and form soil. As soil builds up, the pond becomes shallower and further environmental changes follow.

=== Submerged stage ===
As the water body becomes shallower, more submerged rooted species are able to become established due to increasing light penetration in the shallower water. This is suitable for growth of rooted submerged species such as Myriophyllum, Vallisneria, Elodea, Hydrilla, and Ceratophyllum. These plants root themselves in mud. Once submerged species colonize the successional changes are more rapid and are mainly autogenic as organic matter accumulates. Inorganic sediment is still entering the lake and is trapped more quickly by the net of plant roots and rhizomes growing on the pond floor. The pond becomes sufficiently shallow (2–5 ft) for floating species and less suitable for rooted submerged plants.

=== Floating stage ===
The floating plants are rooted in the mud, but some or all their leaves float on the surface of the water. These include species like Nymphaea, Nelumbo and Potamogeton. Some free-floating species also become associated with root plants. The large and broad leaves of floating plants shade the water surface and conditions become unsuitable for growth of submerged species which start disappearing. The plants decay to form organic mud which makes the pond more shallow yet (1–3 ft).

=== Reed swamp stage ===
The pond is now invaded by emergent plants such as Phragmites (reed-grasses), Typha (cattail), and Zizania (wild rice) to form a reed-swamp (in North American usage, this habitat is called a marsh). These plants have creeping rhizomes which knit the mud together to produce large quantities of leaf litter. This litter is resistant to decay and reed peat builds up, accelerating the autogenic change. The surface of the pond is converted into water-saturated marshy land.

=== Sedge-meadow stage ===
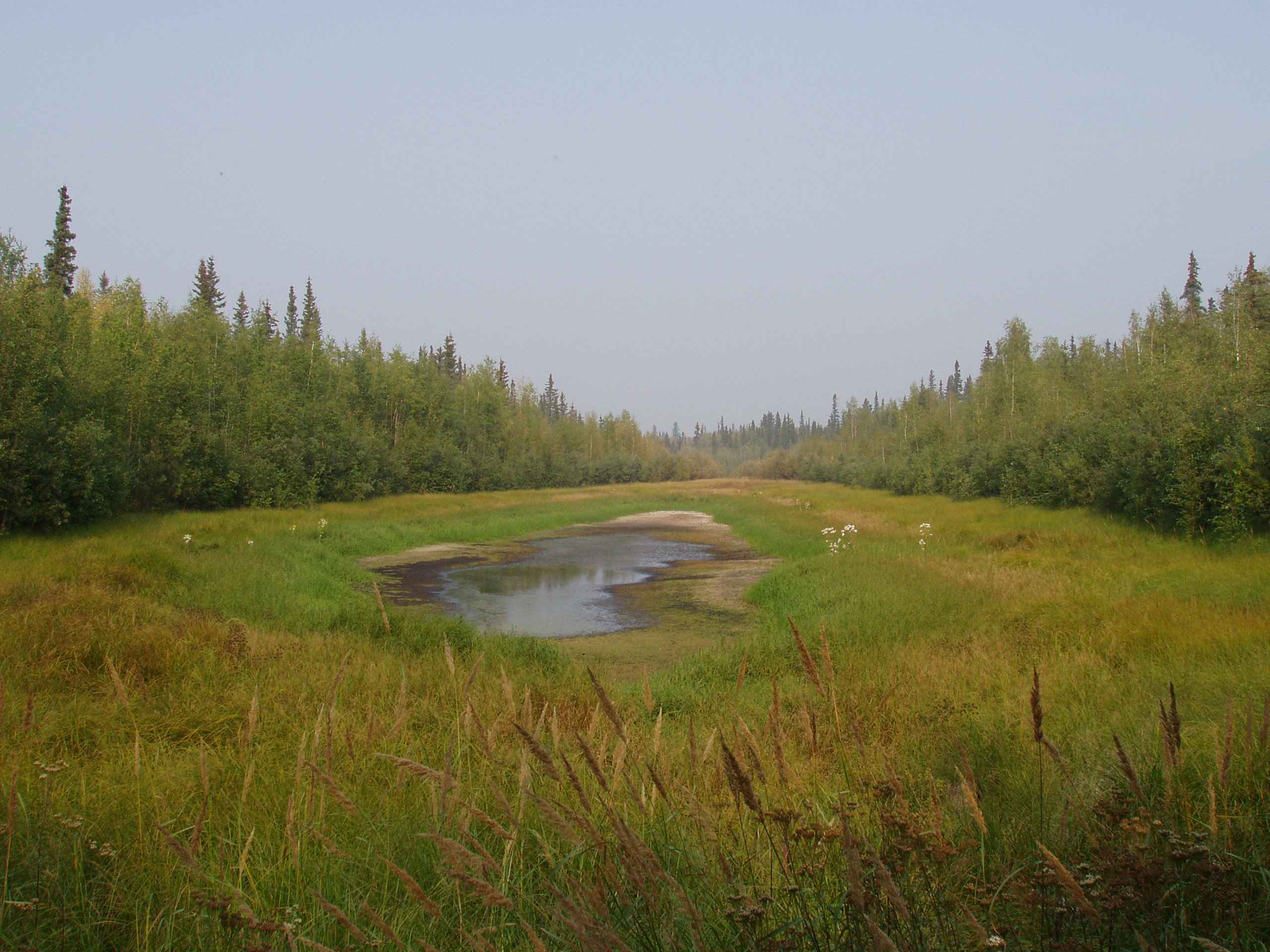
Water surface of a pond nearly covered by vegetation

Successive decreases in water level and changes in substratum help members of Cyperaceae and Graminae such as Carex spp. and Juncus to establish themselves. They form a mat of vegetation extending towards the centre of the pond. Their rhizomes knit the soil further. The above water leaves transpire water to lower the water level further and add additional leaf litter to the soil. Eventually the sedge peat accumulates above the water level and soil is no longer totally waterlogged. The habitat becomes suitable for invasion of herbs (secondary species) such as Mentha, Caltha, Iris, and Galium which grow luxuriantly and bring further changes to the environment. Mesic conditions develop and marshy vegetation begins to disappear.

=== Woodland stage ===
The soil now remains drier for most of the year and becomes suitable for development of wet woodland. It is invaded by shrubs and trees such as Salix (willow), Alnus (alder), and Populus (poplar). These plants react upon the habitat by producing shade, lower the water table still further by transpiration, build up the soil, and lead to the accumulation of humus with associated microorganisms. This type of wet woodland is also known as carr.

=== Climax stage ===
Finally a self-perpetuating climax community develops. It may be a forest if the climate is humid, grassland in case of sub-humid environment, or a desert in arid and semi-arid conditions. A forest is characterized by presence of all types of vegetation including herbs, shrubs, mosses, shade-loving plants and trees. Decomposers are frequent in climax vegetation.

The overall changes taking place during development of successional communities are building up of substratum, shallowing of water, addition of humus and minerals, soil building and aeration of soil. As the water body fills in with sediment, the area of open water decreases and the vegetation types moves inwards as the water becomes shallower. Many of the above-mentioned communities can be seen growing together in a water body. The center is occupied by floating and submerged plants with reeds nearer the shores, followed by sedges and rushes growing at the edges. Still further are shrubs and trees occupying the dry land.

== Examples ==
An example is a small kettle lake called Sweetmere, in Shropshire, UK. Sweetmere is one of many small kettle lakes which formed at the end of the last glacial period when the temperatures began to increase. The ice began to melt and retreat approximately 10,000 years ago.

As the climate slowly began to warm this allowed algae, water lilies and floating aquatic plants to begin to colonise the lake. These, in essence, were the pioneer species. Once these began to die it provided organic matter to the lake bed sediment and therefore increased fertility and reduced depth. As a result, this allowed deeper rooted species to develop such as reed, bulrush and reedmace. At this point there is a growing floating raft of thick organic matter within the lake. Because the bulrushes and reeds have relatively deep roots, this encouraged bioconstruction which traps more sediment, allowing sedges, willow and alder to become established. This process further decreased the water depth and raised the lakebed thus making it drier.

Drier conditions now meant that a wider range of species could inhabit the area. Birch and alder came into dominance. All species which have grown have occurred because of seed transfer either by animals, birds, wind, or water transfer. Water level is further reduced as a result of further bioconstruction and also due to increasing temperatures there is increased evaporation from the lake.

Underneath the birch canopy developed terrestrial shrubs and grasses. This then increased the acidity which increased the rates of nutrient exchange. The area has been artificially drained and this allowed the oak and ash community to develop. This is the seral stage.

The lake is now being managed by cutting down certain species in order to stop the whole lake becoming dried up and dominated by the oak and ash woodland.

Another example of a hydrosere is Loch a' Mhuilin, located on the Isle of Arran, Scotland. This small lake lies behind a ridge of material deposited towards the end of the last ice age. The lake exhibits characteristic features of a hydrosere, the succession from a fresh water surface with small pioneer plant species to a sub-climax vegetation of alder and willow. The climax vegetation of oak and beech woodland has not been achieved due to the impact of human activities of clearing grazing land, as well as grazing by red deer and rabbits.

== See also ==
- Aquatic succession
- Psammosere
- Lithosere
- Seral community
- Xerosere
