= Clastic wedge =

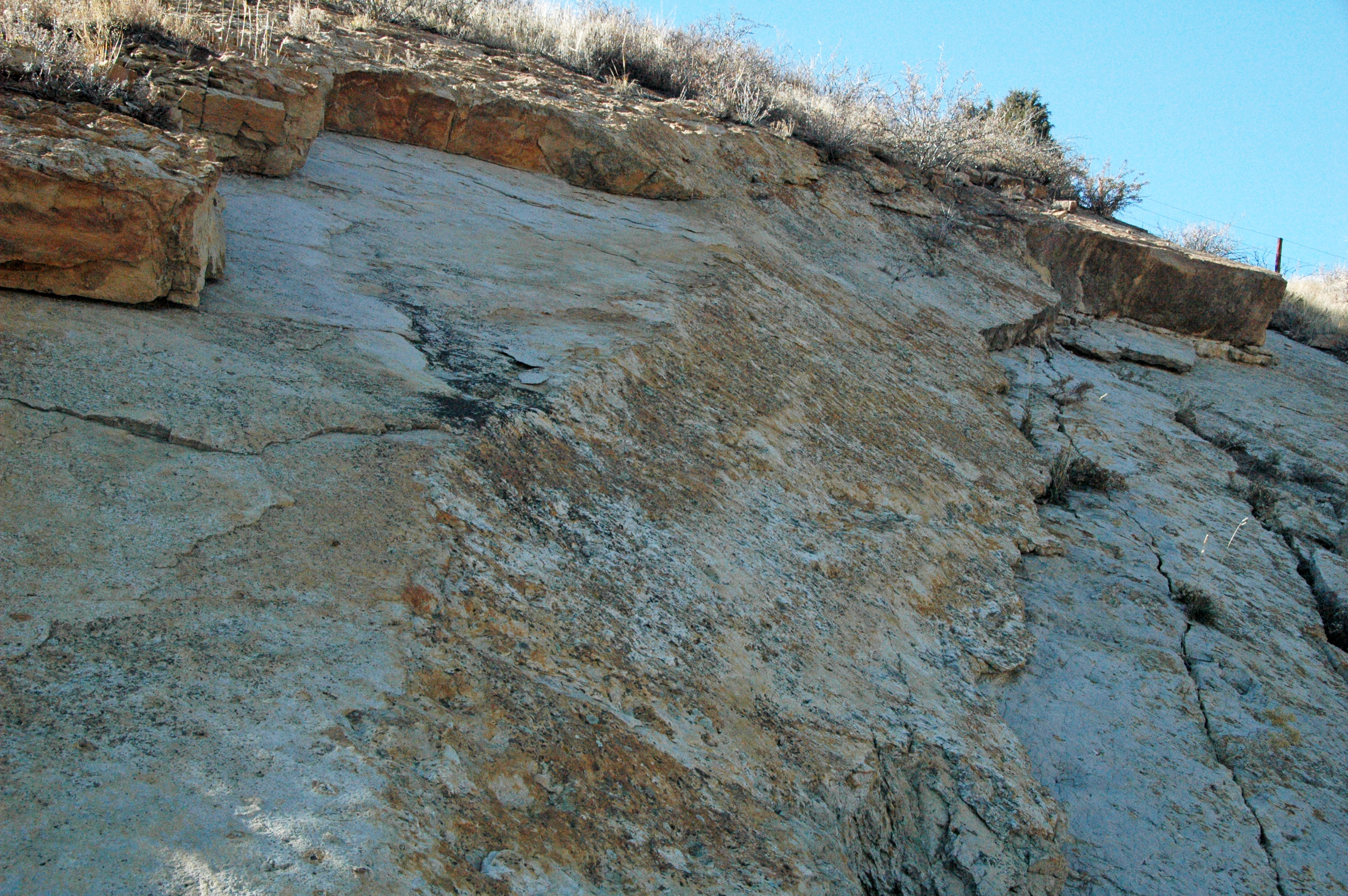
Sedimentary (Wedge) build-up in Dinosaur Ridge, Colorado, USA.

In geology, a clastic wedge is a thick accumulation of sediments or sedimentary rocks eroded and deposited landward of a mountain chain or geological boundary. They begin at the mountain front, thicken considerably landwards of it to a peak depth, and progressively thin with increasing distance inland. As they are often lens-shaped in profile, the process by which these sedimentary wedges are shaped is due to the regressive and transgressive movement from bodies of water. Some examples of clastic wedges in the United States are the Catskill Delta in Appalachia and the sequence of Jurassic and Cretaceous sediments deposited in the Cordilleran foreland basin in the Rocky Mountains.

== Associations ==
Not all clastic wedges are associated with mountains. They are also a characteristic of passive continental margins such as the Gulf Coast; these are quiescent environments, where sediments have accumulated to great thickness over a long period of time. In addition to prehistoric clastic wedges that have grown over time, the presence of microfossils and organic materials shown to be more abundant. These passive margin continental shelf sediment sequences are termed miogeoclines.

Clastic wedges are often separated into one of two distinct types: flysch, mostly dark shales that originate from moderate to deep marine water; and molasse, which is composed mainly of red sandstones, conglomerates, and shales that were deposited in terrestrial or shallow marine environments.

== Sedimentary cycles ==
The conceptual geology of a clastic wedge can be referred to sedimentary cycles; in which is the reoccurring sequence of geological events upon stratigraphic surfaces, specifically involving seismologic alterations and storms. Such events can be correlated to that of typical geological structures, some of which may include deltaic environments or plate tectonics boundaries.

When looking at the development of certain cyclic sequences, it is based upon allogenic and autogenic processes. In regards of the allogenic sedimentary process, it refers to external or extrinsic factors that influence a geological system or environment. Inversely, as for that of the autogenic sedimentary process, it relates internal or intrinsic mechanisms that directly effect geological structures and systems. As of how such methods relate to that of sedimentary cycles and clastic wedges, they come into effect by shaping and weathering surfaces (allogenic) that will conclude in becoming compacted and cemented (autogenic) to the area of crust.

== See also ==
- Accretionary wedge
- Clastic rock
