= Big Beaver Creek Wildlife Area =

State wildlife area in Dunn County, Wisconsin

- Big Beaver Creek State Wildlife Area
- IUCN category V (protected landscape/seascape)
- Location within Wisconsin Location within the United States
- Location: Dunn County, Wisconsin
- Nearest city: Menomonie, Wisconsin
- Coordinates: 45°6′57″N 91°57′54″W
- Area: 572 acres (231 ha)
- Established: 1959
- Governing body: Wisconsin Department of Natural Resources

The Big Beaver Creek Wildlife Area is a 572-acre (231 ha) tract of protected land located in Dunn County, Wisconsin, managed by the Wisconsin Department of Natural Resources (WDNR). Land to be used for the wildlife area was first acquired in 1959 to provide access to the Big Beaver Creek and Little Beaver Creek, along with the associated wetlands complex. The other major goal was to open up the area to state-sponsored timber harvesting, specifically that of tamarack.

== Big Beaver Creek ==
The Big Beaver Creek Wildlife Area is composed of two parts, the primary wildlife area to the south, and the somewhat separate Big Beaver Meadow State Natural Area. The 110 acres (45 ha) natural area is to a large extent landlocked with little to no road access, which resulted in the offering up for sale of the most affected areas, a 78 acres (32 ha) tract of mostly sedge meadow.

== Flora and fauna ==
There are several different species of trees in the wildlife area, including white pine, white oak, red oak, and two different species of maple, sugar maple and red maple. In addition to the various species of trees found on the property, there are six "high priority" species of bird that are known to frequent the area; the northern bobwhite quail, blue-winged warbler, brown thrasher, field sparrow, whip-poor-will and the willow flycatcher. Besides birds, white-tailed deer, turkeys and rabbits can be found in the area.

While there has been a continuous effort by the WDNR to limit the expansion of invasive species detrimental to protected areas in Wisconsin, multiple such invasive florae reside in the Big Beaver Creek Wildlife Area. These include buckthorn, honeysuckle, garlic mustard and siberian elm. Invasive fauna include the gypsy moth and emerald ash borer.

== See also ==
- Wildlife management
