= Lithosere =

Plant succession on newly exposed rock surface

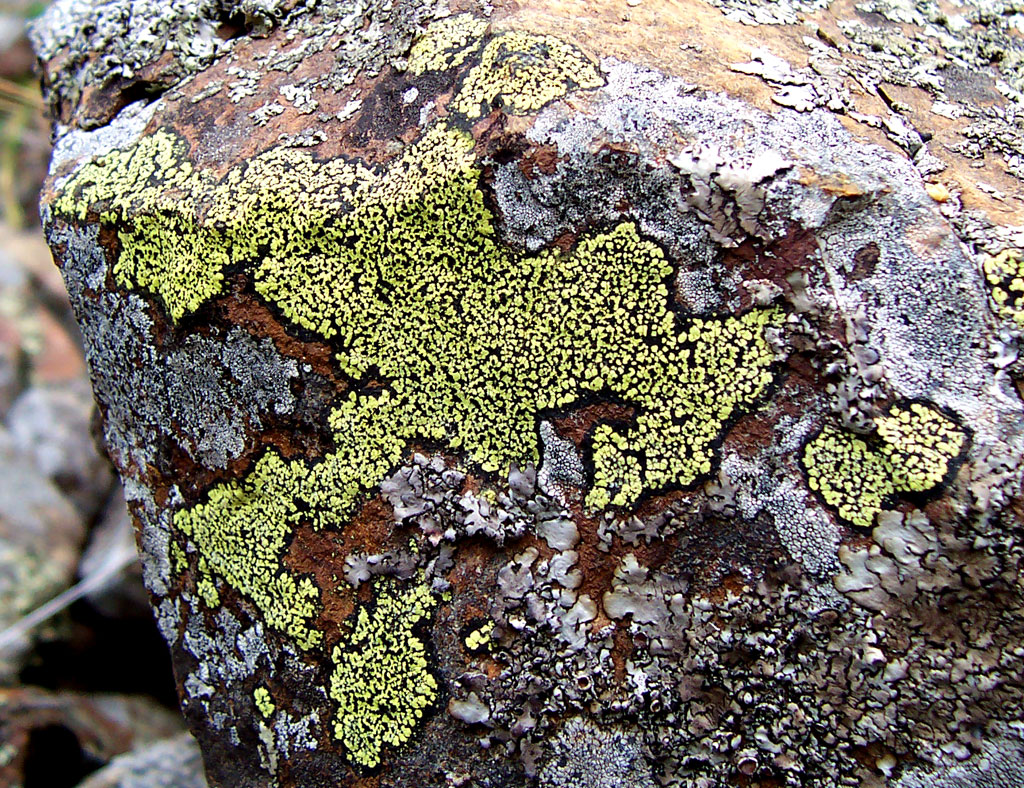

A lithosere (a sere originating on rock) is a plant succession that begins life on a newly exposed rock surface, such as one left bare as a result of glacial retreat, tectonic uplift as in the formation of a raised beach, or volcanic eruptions. For example, the lava fields of Eldgjá in Iceland where Laki and Katla fissures erupted in the year 935, and the solidified lava has, over time, begun to form a lithosere.

Pioneer species are the first organisms that colonise an area, of which lithoseres are an example. They will typically be very hardy (i.e., they will be xerophytes, wind-resistant or cold-resistant). In the case of a lithosere the pioneer species will be cyanobacteria and algae, which create their own food and water—i.e., they are autotrophic and so do not require any external nutrition (except sunlight). For example, the first lithosere observed after the volcanic explosion of Krakatoa was algae. Other examples of lithoseres include communities of mosses and lichens, as they are extremely resilient and are capable of surviving in areas without soil.

As more mosses and lichens colonize the area, they, along with natural elements such as wind and frost shattering, begin to weather the rock down. This over time creates more soil, leading to increased water retention. Early on, when there is little water, lichens dominate as they are more suited to a lack of water; but as water retention increases, mosses become more dominant as they are faster growing, and these further break the rocks down. The amount of soil is also increased by the decaying mosses and lichens. This improves the fertility of the soil as humus is increased, allowing grasses and ferns to colonise. Over time, flowering plants will emerge, followed by shrubs. As the soil gets progressively deeper, larger and more advanced plants are able to grow. This is the case in Surtsey, a "new", small volcanic island located off the south coast of Iceland. Surtsey was "created" in the 1960s and currently its plant succession has reached the stage where ferns and grasses have begun to start growing in the south of the island where the lava cooled first.

As the plant succession develops further, trees start to appear. The first trees (or pioneer trees) that appear are typically fast growing trees such as birch, willow or rowan. In turn these will be replaced by slow growing, larger trees such as ash and oak. This is the climax community on a lithosere, defined as the point where a plant succession does not develop any further—it reaches a delicate equilibrium with the environment, in particular the climate.

In the off chance of a phenomenon which effectively removes most of the lifeforms in these areas, the resultant landscape is considered to be a disclimax, where there is a loss of the previous climax community. Factors which interrupt succession include: human intervention (plagioclimax), change in relief of land (topoclimax), change in animal species (biotic climax) or change in soil such as an increase in acidity (edaphic climax) . In most cases, should the area be left to regenerate as normal when the limiting factor is removed, the area eventually becomes a climax community again (secondary succession).

== See also ==
- Hydrosere
- Psammosere
- Seral community
- Xerosere

== Sources ==
- Codrington, S. B. (2005) Planet Geography. Solid Star Press. pp. 322–323. ISBN 0-9579819-3-7
- Smithson, P.; K. Addison. (2002) Fundamentals of the Physical Environment. Routledge. pp. 432–433. ISBN 0-415-23293-7
- Verma, P. S.; V.K. Agarwal. (2000) Environmental Biology: Principles of Ecology. Chand (S.) & Co Ltd., India. pp. 303–304. ISBN 81-219-0859-0
