= Xerosere =

Plant succession limited by water availability

Xerosere is a plant succession that is limited by water availability. It includes the different stages in a xerarch succession. Xerarch succession of ecological communities originated in extremely dry situation such as sand deserts, sand dunes, salt deserts, rock deserts etc. A xerosere may include lithoseres (on rock) and psammoseres (on sand).

== Stages ==
=== Bare rocks ===
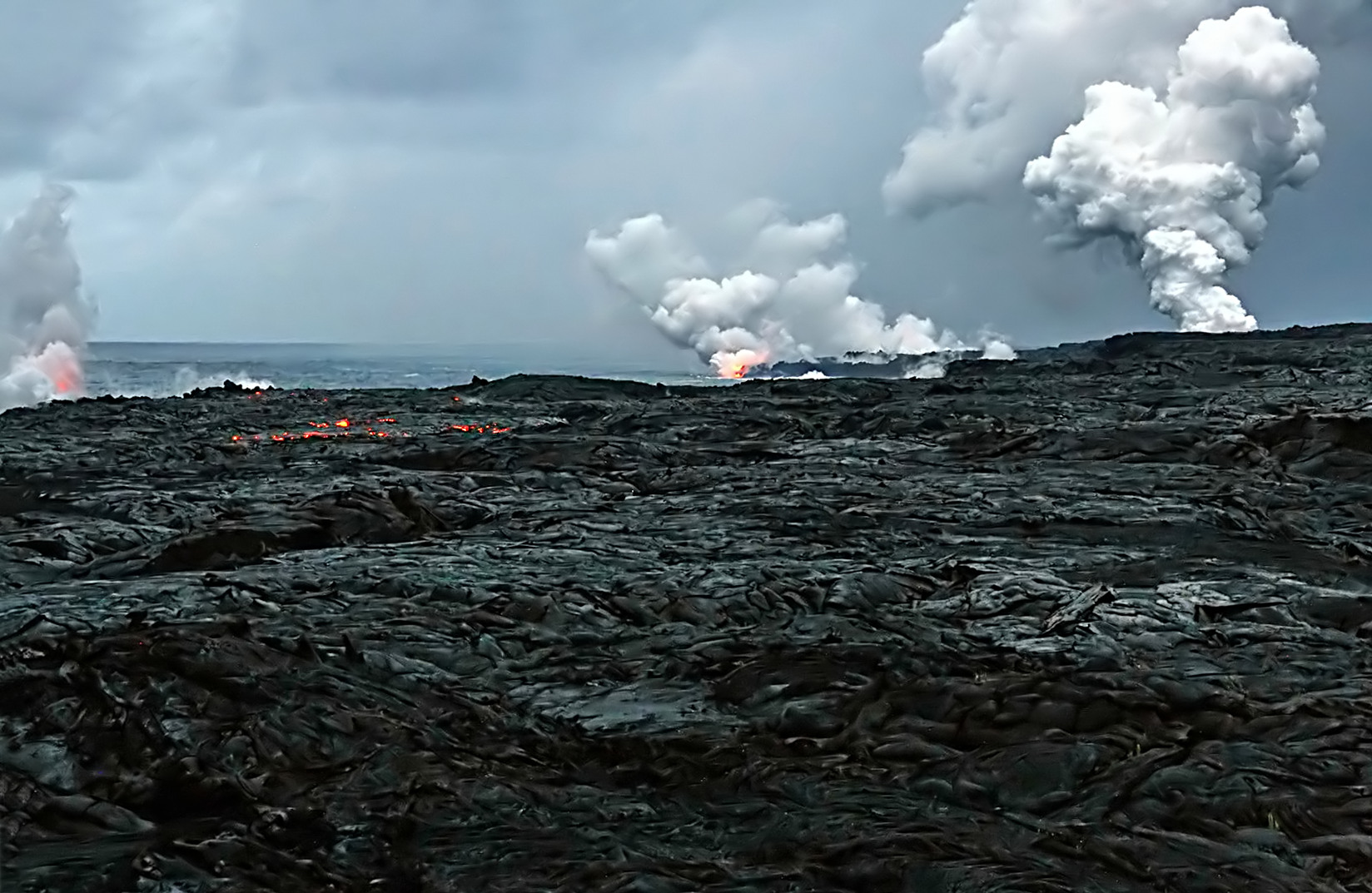
Lava enters the Pacific at the Big Island of Hawaii

Bare rocks are produced when glaciers recede or volcanoes erupt. The erosion of these rocks is caused by rainwater and wind, which are loaded with soil particles. The rainwater combines with atmospheric carbon dioxide that corrodes the surface of the rocks and produces crevices. Water enters these crevices, freezes, and expands to separate boulders. These boulders move down by gravity and wear particles from the rocks. Also, when the wind loaded with soil particles strikes against the rocks, it removes soil particles. All these processes lead to the formation of a bit of soil at the surface of these bare rocks. Animals such as spiders which can hide between boulders or stones invade these rocks. These animals live by feeding on insects that have been blown in or flown in. Algal and fungal spores reach these rocks by air from the surrounding areas. These spores grow and form symbiotic associations, lichen, which act as pioneer species of bare rocks. The succession process starts when autotrophic organisms start living in the rocks.

=== Foliose and fruticose lichen stage ===
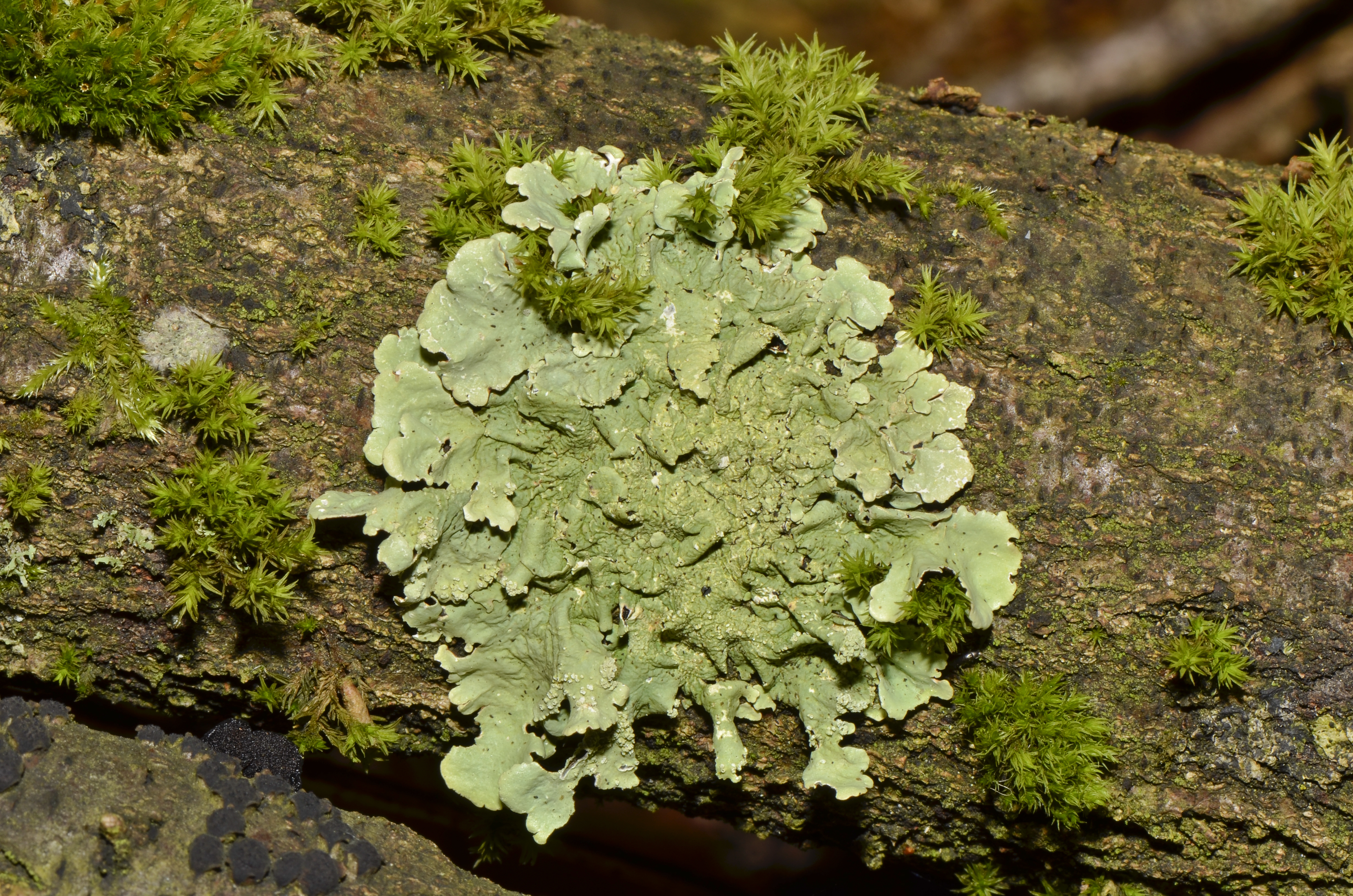
Flavoparmelia caperata, a species of foliose lichen, on a tree branch.

Foliose lichens have leaf-like thalli, while the fruticose lichens are like small bushes. They are attached to the substratum at one point only, therefore, do not cover the soil completely. They can absorb and retain more water and are able to accumulate more dust particles. Their dead remains are decomposed to humus which mixes with soil particles and help building substratum and improving soil moisture contents further. The shallow depressions in the rocks and crevices become filled with soil and topsoil layer increases further. These autogenic changes favor growth and establishment of mosses.

=== Moss stage ===
The spores of xerophytic mosses, such as Polytrichum, Tortula, and Grimmia, are brought to the rock where they succeed lichens. Their rhizoids penetrate soil among the crevices, secrete acids and corrode the rocks. The bodies of mosses are rich in organic and inorganic compounds. When these die they add these compounds to the soil, increasing the fertility of the soil. As mosses develop in patches they catch soil particles from the air and help increase the amount of substratum. The changing environment leads to migration of lichens and helps invasion of herbaceous vegetation that can out-compete mosses.

=== Herb stage ===
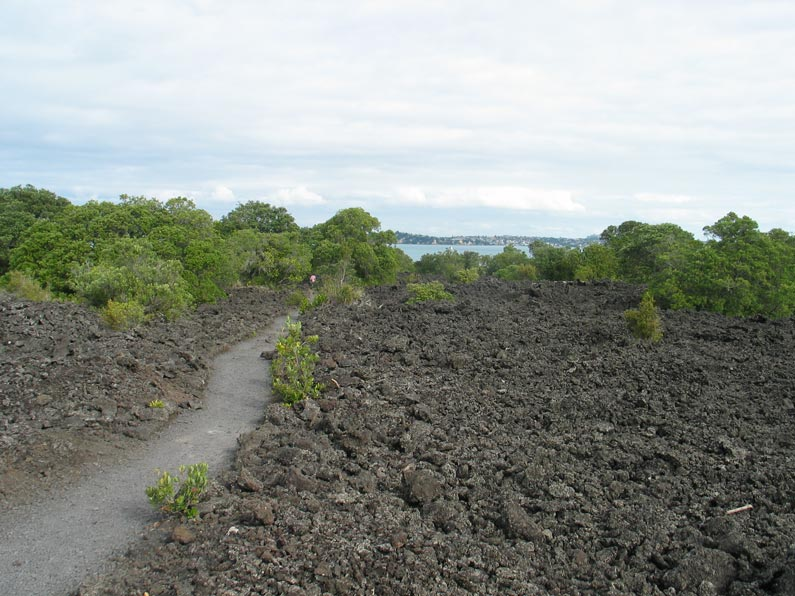
Encroaching herbs and shrubs

Herbaceous weeds, mostly annuals such as asters, evening primroses, and milk weeds, invade the rock. Their roots penetrate deep down, secrete acids and enhance the process of weathering. Leaf litter and death of herbs add humus to the soil. Shading of soil results in decrease in evaporation and there is a slight increase in temperature. As a result, the xeric conditions begin to change and biennial and perennial herbs and xeric grasses such as Aristida, Festuca, and Poa, begin to inhabit. These climatic conditions favor growth of bacterial and fungal populations, resulting in increase in decomposition activities.

=== Shrub stage ===
The herb and grass mixture is invaded by shrub species, such as Rhus and Physocarpus. Early invasion of shrub is slow, but once a few bushes have become established, birds invade the area and help disperse scrub seeds. This results in dense scrub growth shading the soil and making conditions unfavorable for the growth of herbs, which then begin to migrate. The soil formation continues and its moisture content increases.

=== Tree stage ===
Change in environment favors colonization of tree species. The tree saplings begin to grow among the scrubs and establish themselves. The kind of tree species inhabiting the area depends upon the nature of the soil. In poorly drained soils oaks establish themselves. The trees form canopy and shade the area. Shade-loving scrubs continue to grow as secondary vegetation. Leaf litter and decaying roots weather the soil further and add humus to it making the habitat more favorable for growth to trees. Mosses and ferns make their appearance and fungi population grows abundantly.

=== Climax stage ===
The succession culminates in a climax community, the forest. Many intermediate tree stages develop prior to establishment of a climax community. The forest type depends upon climatic conditions. The climax forest may be:tbh

Oak-hickory climax forest
In dry habitat oaks and hickories are climax vegetation. There is only one tree stage and forests are characterized by presence of scrubs, herbs, ferns, and mosses.
Beech-hemlock climax forest
These climax forests develop in mesic climates. The dominant vegetation is beech and hemlock. There are many intermediate tree stages. The other vegetation types include herbs, ferns, and mosses.
Beech-maple climax forest
These climax forests develop in mesic climates in the Northeastern United States. The dominant vegetation is American beech and sugar maple.
Spruce-alpine fir climax forest
At high altitudes in Rocky Mountains the climax forest is dominated by spruces and alpine firs.

== See also ==
- Hydrosere
- Lithosere
- Psammosere
- Seral community
