= Halosere =

Ecological succession in a saline environment

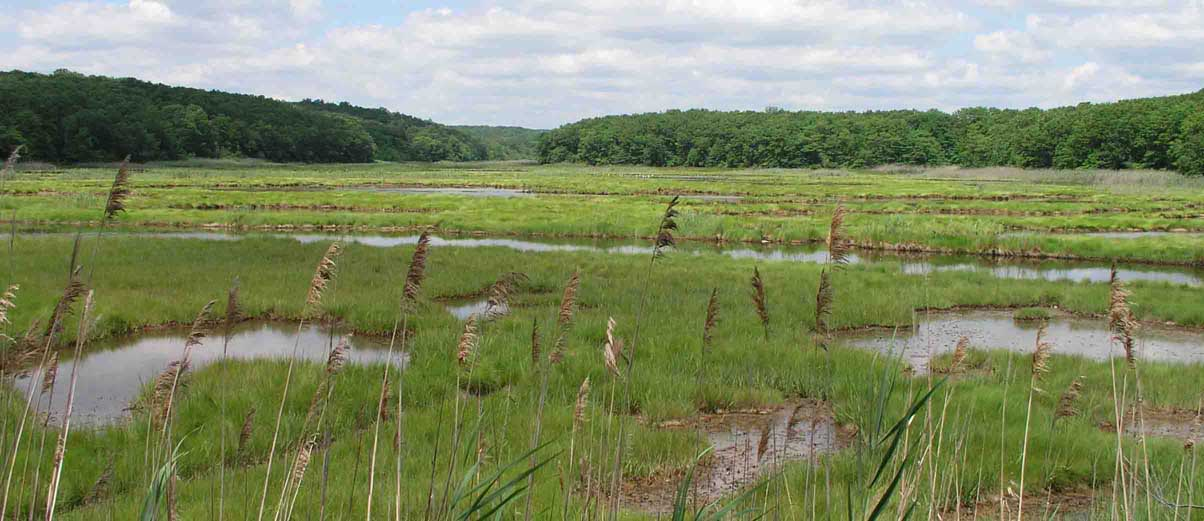
A salt marsh

A halosere is an ecological succession in saline water environments. An example of a halosere is a salt marsh.

In a river estuary, large amounts of silt are deposited by the ebbing tides, as well as inflowing rivers.

== Plants in halosere ==
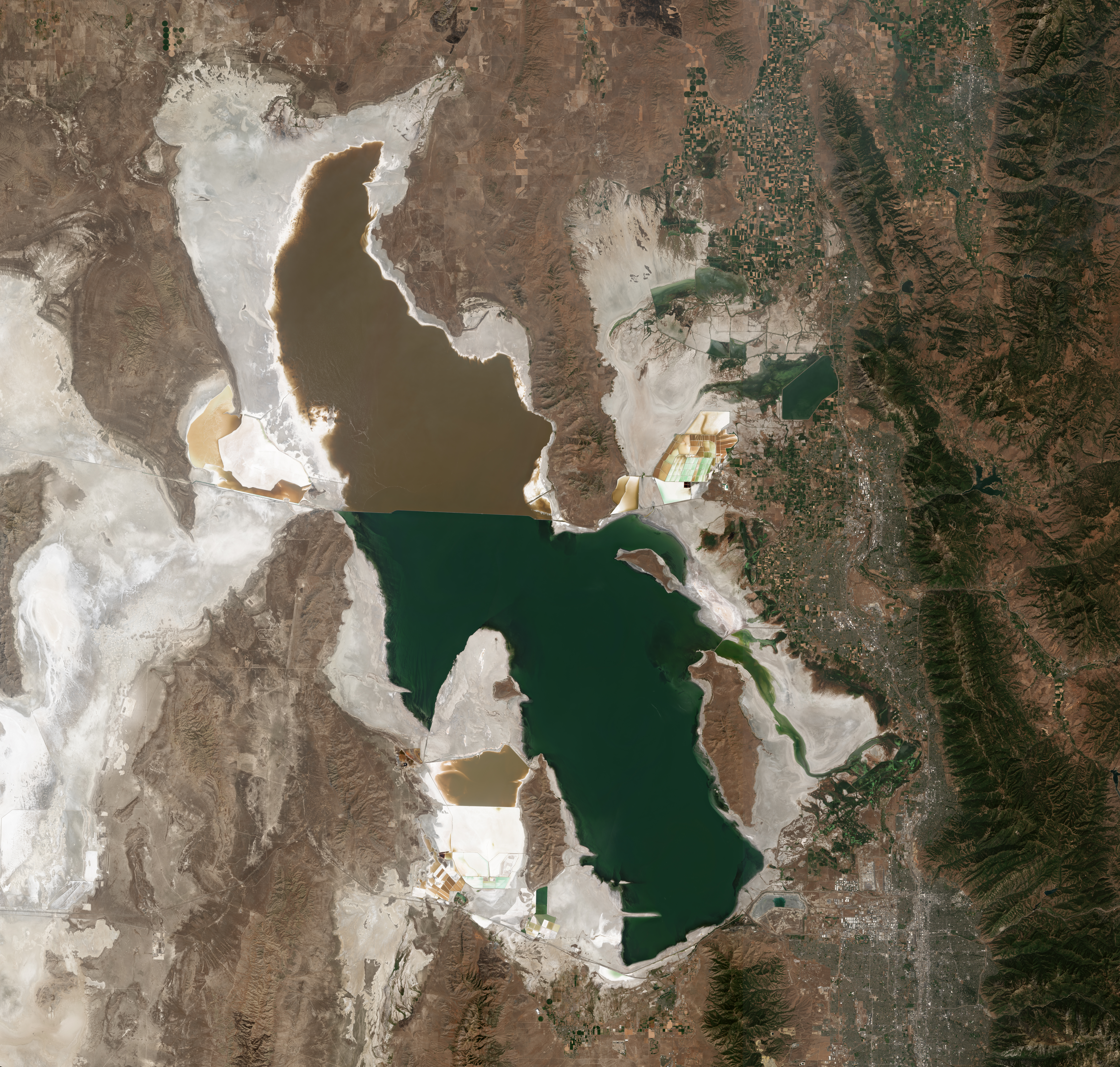
The Great Salt Lake in Utah, satellite photo from August 2018 after years of drought

The earliest plant colonizers are algae and zostera, which can tolerate submergence by the tide for most of the 12 hour cycle and which trap mud, causing it to accumulate.

Two other colonizer plants are Salicornia, and Spartina, which are both halophytes. Halophytes are plants that can tolerate saline conditions and they grow on the intertidal mudflats with a maximum of four hours' exposure to air every 12 hours. On a large scale halophytes have colonized the halosere on the banks of the Great Salt Lake in Utah. Halosere vegetation can also be found in the salt marshes of the Wadden Sea islands and the zone towards the dunes.

=== River estuaries ===
In a river estuary, large amounts of silt are deposited. Halosere in river estuaries consist of mudflats and the so called sward zone. Halosere sward zones can be found in the Llanrhidian marsh on the Gower Peninsula.

== See also ==
- Seral community
