= Plagioclimax community =

Habitat limited by human influence

A Plagioclimax community is an area or habitat in which the influences of the humans have prevented the ecosystem from developing further. The ecosystem may have been stopped from reaching its full climatic climax or deflected towards a different climax by activities such as:

- Cutting down the existing vegetation
- Burning as a means of forest clearance
- planting trees or crops
- Grazing and trampling by domesticated animals
- Harvesting of planted crops

These are known as disturbances, or arresting factors.

In each case, human activity has led to a community which is not the climax community expected in such an area. If the human activity continues, the community will be held in a stable position and further succession will not occur until the human activity ceases.

== Examples ==
An example may be in a beach dune system where the impact of the human race has caused footpath erosion to occur, affecting the vegetation so that feet trampling on the dune plants eventually destroys them.

The uplands of Northern England were once covered by deciduous woodland. Some heather would have been present, but in relatively small amounts. Gradually the forests were removed during the early Middle Ages for timber and fuel purposes, and to create space for agricultural activities. The soil deteriorated as a result and heather came to dominate the plant community. Sheep grazing was the major form of agriculture in the area at the time and the sheep prevented the re-growth of woodland by destroying any young saplings.

In more recent times the process of controlled burning of the heather has taken place. The heather is burnt after 15 years of its life cycle before it becomes mature and allows colonisation of the area by other plants. The ash adds to the soil fertility and the new growth that results increase the productivity of the ecosystem and provides the sheep with a more nutritious diet than is provided by the elder heather. This controlled burning maintains a plant community which is not the climatic climax of the area, and is therefore a plagioclimax.

In Studland Heath in Dorset, England, the management agency prevents the climax community (in this case trees) becoming established. At Studland the aim is to keep the area as heathland, so that the small reptiles that inhabit the dune system continue to survive. If the area is allowed to develop naturally into woodland, the reptiles would be replaced by other species of animals.
