= Autogenic succession =

"Auto-" meaning self or same, and "-genic" meaning producing or causing. Autogenic succession refers to ecological succession driven by biotic factors within an ecosystem and although the mechanisms of autogenic succession have long been debated, the role of living things in shaping the progression of succession was realized early on. Presently, there is more of a consensus that the mechanisms of facilitation, tolerance, and inhibition all contribute to autogenic succession. The concept of succession is most often associated with communities of vegetation and forests, though it is applicable to a broader range of ecosystems. In contrast, allogenic succession is driven by the abiotic components of the ecosystem.

== How it occurs ==
The plants themselves (biotic components) cause succession to occur.

- Light captured by leaves
- Production of detritus
- Water and nutrient uptake
- Nitrogen fixation
- anthropogenic climate change

These aspects lead to a gradual ecological change in a particular spot of land, known as a progression of inhabiting species. Autogenic succession can be viewed as a secondary succession because of pre-existing plant life. A 2000 case study in the journal Oecologia tested the hypothesis that areas with high plant diversity could suppress weed growth more effectively than those with lower plant diversity.

=== Facilitation ===
- Improvement of site factors like increased organic matter

=== Inhibition ===
- Hinders species or growth
