= Allogenic succession =

Succession driven by the abiotic components of an ecosystem

In ecology, allogenic succession is succession driven by the abiotic components of an ecosystem. In contrast, autogenic succession is driven by the biotic components of the ecosystem. An allogenic succession can be initiated in a number of ways which can include:

- Volcanic eruptions
- Meteor or comet strike
- Flooding
- Drought
- Earthquakes
- Non-anthropogenic climate change

Allogenic succession can happen on a time scale that is proportionate with the disturbance. For example, allogenic succession that is the result of non-anthropogenic climate change can happen over thousands of years.

== Example ==
The majority of Salt Marsh development comes from allogenic succession. The constant exposure to water in the intertidal zone causes the soil of a salt marsh to change over time. This results in sedimentation and nutrient buildup that also slowly raises the level of the land. What started as a sandy soil with a slightly high pH level, eventually becomes a loamy soil with a more neutral pH level. During this period, the soil-salinity will also change by starting low and eventually rising to higher levels from continued seawater exposure.

Glacier forelands are another example of ecosystems that form from autogenic but also partly allogenic succession. The importance of this is estimated to be higher in earlier successional stages, regarding rock formations, slope angles and soil composition.
