= Climax community =

Mature ecological community of organisms best adapted to an area

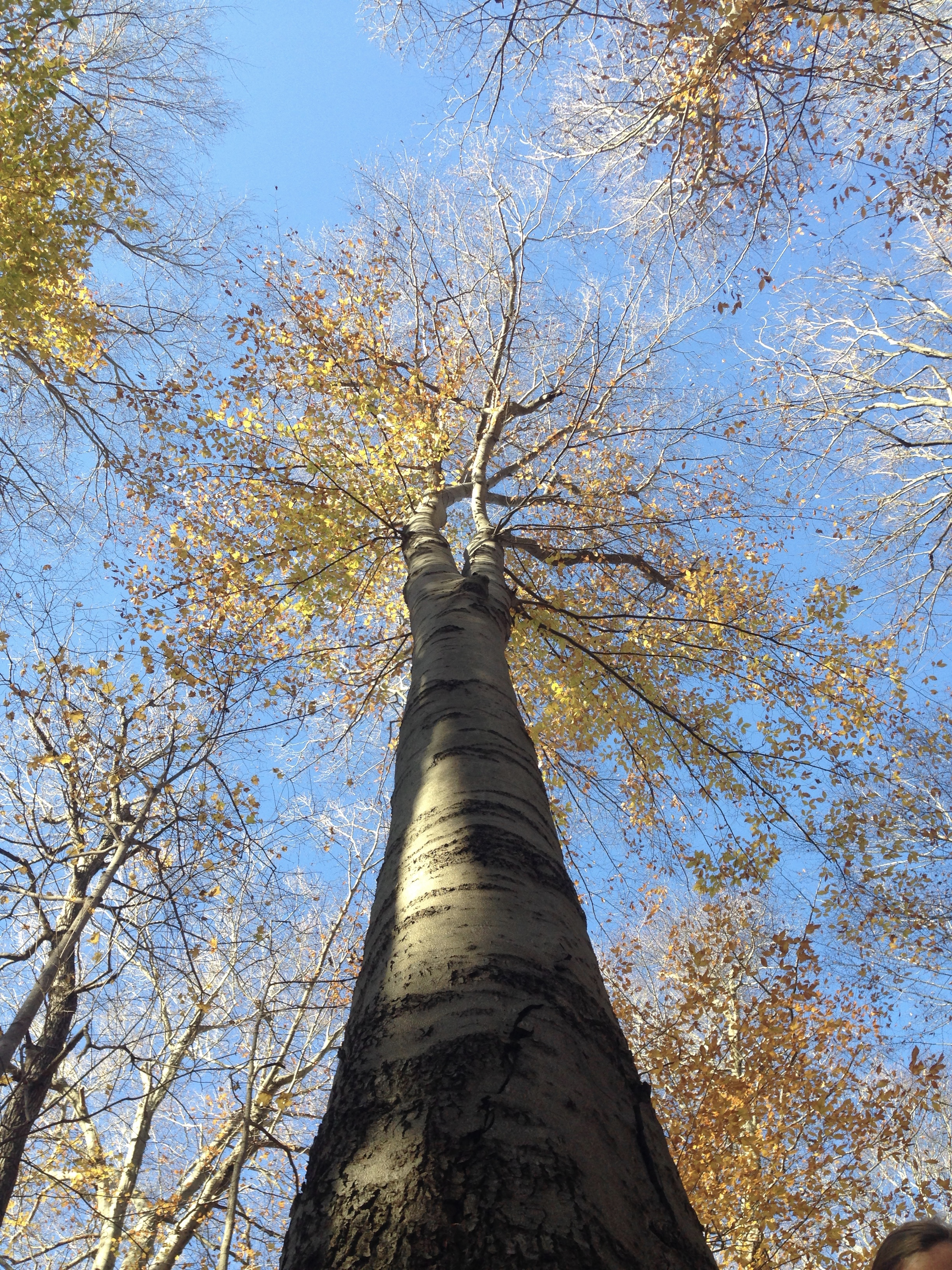
Warren Woods in Michigan, USA, is an example of a beech-maple climax forest. Beech (center) and sugar maple (bottom left) dominate the forest due to their towering height and tolerance of shade.

In scientific ecology, climax community or climatic climax community is a historic term for a community of plants, animals, and fungi which, through the process of ecological succession in the development of vegetation in an area over time, have reached a steady state. This equilibrium was thought to occur because the climax community is composed of species best adapted to average conditions in that area. The term is sometimes also applied in soil development. Nevertheless, it has been found that a "steady state" is more apparent than real, particularly across long timescales.

The idea of a single climax, which is defined in relation to regional climate, originated with Frederic Clements in the early 1900s. The first analysis of succession as leading to something like a climax was written by Henry Cowles in 1899, but it was Clements who used the term "climax" to describe the idealized endpoint of succession.

== Frederic Clements' use of "climax" ==
Clements described the successional development of an ecological community comparable to the ontogenetic development of individual organisms. Clements suggested only comparisons to very simple organisms. Later ecologists developed this idea that the ecological community is a "superorganism" and even sometimes claimed that communities could be homologous to complex organisms and sought to define a single climax-type for each area. The English botanist Arthur Tansley developed this idea with the "polyclimax"—multiple steady-state end-points, determined by edaphic factors, in a given climatic zone. Clements had called these end-points other terms, not climaxes, and had thought they were not stable because by definition, climax vegetation is best-adapted to the climate of a given area. Henry Gleason's early challenges to Clements' organism simile, and other strategies of his for describing vegetation were largely disregarded for several decades until substantially vindicated by research in the 1950s and 1960s (below). Meanwhile, climax theory was deeply incorporated in both theoretical ecology and in vegetation management. Clements' terms such as pre-climax, post-climax, plagioclimax and disclimax continued to be used to describe the many communities which persist in states that diverge from the climax ideal for a particular area.

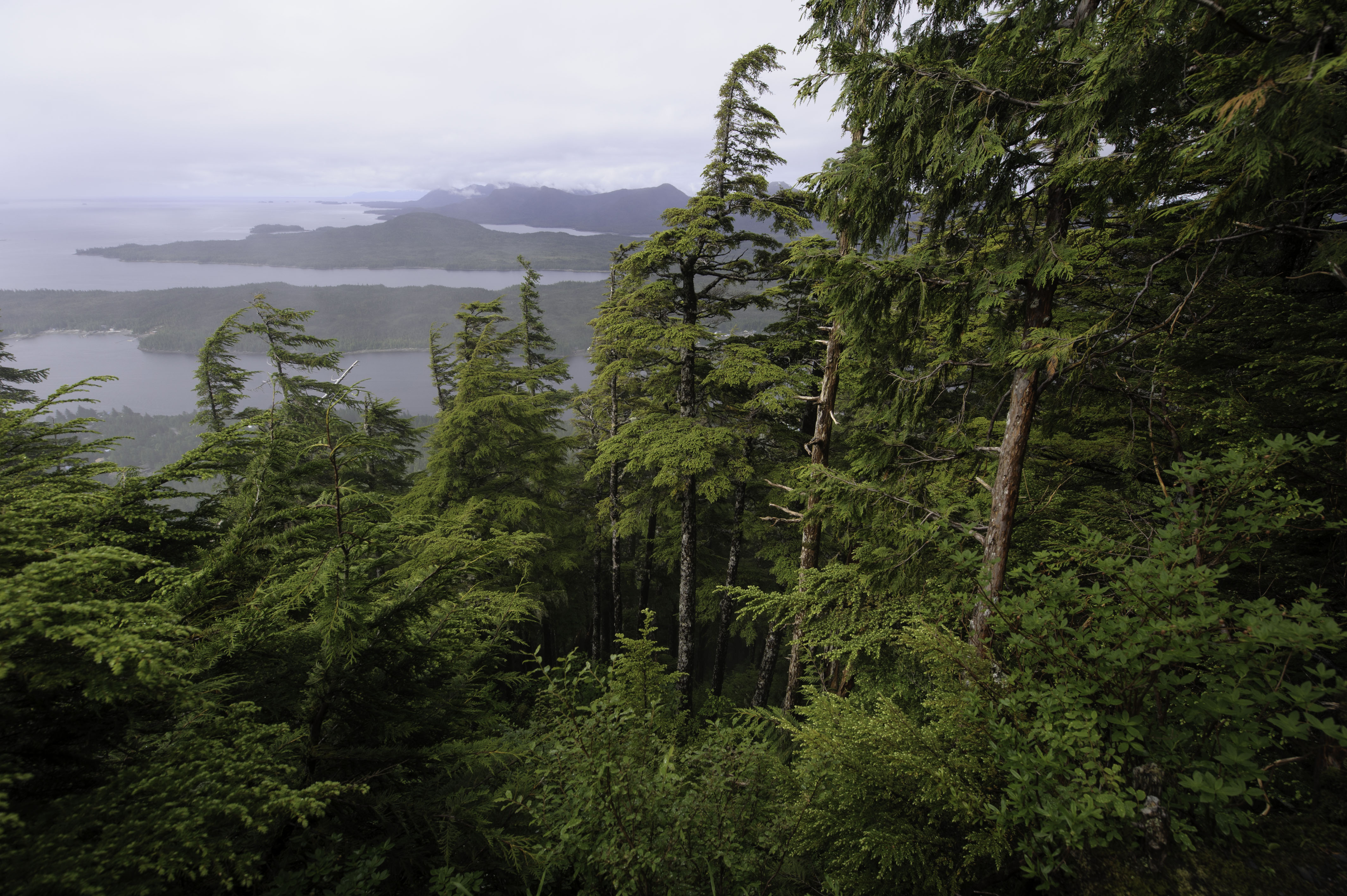
Climax community in Tongass National Forest, Alaska, a Sitka spruce-western hemlock forest. The primary disturbances are floods, landslides, and salt spray, all of which occur only in small areas, allowing for a relatively stable equilibrium.

Though the views are sometimes attributed to him, Clements never argued that climax communities must always occur, or that the different species in an ecological community are tightly integrated physiologically, or that plant communities have sharp boundaries in time or space. Rather, he employed the idea of a climax community—of the form of vegetation best adapted to some idealized set of environmental conditions—as a conceptual starting point for describing the vegetation in a given area. There are good reasons to believe that the species best adapted to some conditions might appear there when those conditions occur. But much of Clements' work was devoted to characterizing what happens when those ideal conditions do not occur. In those circumstances, vegetation other than the ideal climax will often occur instead. But those different kinds of vegetation can still be described as deviations from the climax ideal. Therefore, Clements developed a very large vocabulary of theoretical terms describing the various possible causes of vegetation, and various non-climax states vegetation adopts as a consequence. His method of dealing with ecological complexity was to define an ideal form of vegetation—the climax community—and describe other forms of vegetation as deviations from that ideal.

== Continuing usage of "climax" ==
Despite the overall abandonment of climax theory, during the 1990s use of climax concepts again became more popular among some theoretical ecologists. Many authors and nature-enthusiasts continue to use the term "climax" in a diluted form to refer to what might otherwise be called mature or old-growth communities. The term "climax" has also been adopted as a description for a late successional stage for marine macroinvertebrate communities.

Additionally, some contemporary ecologists still use the term "disclimax" to describe an ecosystem dominated by invasive species that competitively prevent the re-introduction of once native species. This concept borrows from Clements' earliest interpretation of climax as referring to an ecosystem that is resistant to colonization by outside species. The term disclimax was used in-context by Clements (1936), and despite being an anthropogenic phenomenon which prevents the facilitation and succession to a true climax community, it is one of the only examples of climax that can be observed in nature.

== See also ==
- Stratification (vegetation)
- Wood-pasture hypothesis
