= Brian J. Enquist =

American biologist and academic

- Born: United States
- Citizenship: American
- Education: Colorado College; University of New Mexico
- Known for: Metabolic Scaling Theory; Macroecology
- Scientific career
- Fields: Ecology; Macroecology; Global Ecology; Plant Ecology; Plant Ecophysiology
- Workplaces: University of ArizonaThe Santa Fe Institute
- Thesis: On the origin and consequences of allometric scaling in biology. (1998)
- Doctoral advisor: James H. Brown

Brian Joseph Enquist is an American biologist and academic. Enquist is a professor of biology at the University of Arizona. He is also external professor at the Santa Fe Institute. He is a biologist, plant biologist and an ecologist. He was elected as a Fellow of the American Association for the Advancement of Science (AAAS) in 2012 and the Ecological Society of America (ESA) in 2018.

== Research ==
His lab works on developing a more integrative, quantitative, and predictive framework for biology, community ecology, and large-scale ecology. His research is notable for three areas in biology and ecology:

(1) Scaling in Biology – Enquist is notable in biology for his work with Geoffrey West and James H. Brown, in understanding the origin and diversity of organismal form, function, and diversity by developing general models for the origin of allometry and scaling laws in biology. This research, shows how general scaling laws underlie organismal form, function, and diversity and can be used to 'scale up' biological processes from genes to cells to ecosystems. This work is also the foundation for the Metabolic Theory of Ecology.

(2) Functional Plant Ecology and Trait-based biology – Enquist has worked to develop Trait Driver Theory or TDT with Van M. Savage, Jon Norberg and colleagues. TDT provides a general theory of Functional ecology in that it provides a baseline for (i) recasting the predictions of ecological theories based on species richness (see Coexistence theory) in terms of the shape of trait distributions and (ii) integrating Metabolic Scaling Theory how specific traits, including body size, and functional diversity then ‘scale up’ to influence ecosystem functioning and the dynamics of species assemblages across climate gradients. Further, TDT offers a novel framework to integrate trait, metabolic/allometric, and species-richness-based approaches and theory to better predict functional biogeography and how assemblages of species have and may respond to climate change.

== Education and honors ==
=== Education ===
Enquist received a Bachelor of Arts in Biology in 1991 from Colorado College and a Ph.D. in Biology in 1998 from the University of New Mexico.

=== Honors ===
- George Mercer Award (Ecological Society of America), (2001)
- Honorary Degree, PhD in Science, Colorado College, (2007).
- Eminent Ecologist, Kellogg Biological Station, (2010)
- Visiting Fellow Oxford Martin School, Oxford University, UK, (2017)
- ESA Fellow Ecological Society of America, (2018)
