= Urban scaling =

Scientific field studying cities as complex systems

Urban scaling is an area of research within the study of cities as complex systems. It examines how various urban indicators change systematically with city size.

The literature on urban scaling was motivated by the success of scaling theory in biology, itself motivated in turn by the success of scaling in physics. Crucial insights from scaling analysis applied to a system can emerge from finding power-law function relationships between variables of interest and the size of the system (as opposed to finding power-law probability distributions). Power-laws have an implicit self-similarity which suggests universal mechanisms at work, which in turn supports the search for fundamental laws. The study of power-laws is closely linked to the study of critical phenomena in physics, in which emergent properties and scale invariance are central and organizing concepts. These concepts resurface in the study of complex systems, and are of particular importance in the urban scaling framework.

The phenomenon of scaling in biology is often referred to as allometric scaling. Some of these relationships were studied by Galileo (e.g., in terms of the area width of animals' legs as a function of their mass) and then studied a century ago by Max Kleiber (see Kleiber's law) in terms of the relationship between basal metabolic rate and mass. A theoretical explanation of allometric scaling laws in biology was provided by the metabolic theory of ecology.

The application of scaling in the context of cities is inspired by the idea that, in cities, urban activities are emergent phenomena emerging from the interactions of many individuals in close physical proximity. This is in contrast to applying scaling to countries or other social group delineations, which are more ad-hoc sociological constructions. The expectation is that collective effects in cities should result in the form of large-scale quantitative urban regularities that ought to hold across cultures, countries and history. If such regularities are observed, then it would support the search for a general mathematical theory of cities.

Indeed, Luís M. A. Bettencourt, Geoffrey West, and Jose Lobo's seminal work demonstrated that many urban indicators are associated with population size through a power-law relationship, in which socio-economic quantities tend to scale superlinearly, while measures of infrastructure (such as the number of gas stations) scale sublinearly with population size. They argued for a quantitative, predictive framework to understand cities as collective wholes, guiding urban policy, improving sustainability, and managing urban growth.

The literature has grown, with many theoretical explanations for these emergent power-laws. Ribeiro and Rybski summarized these in their paper "Mathematical models to explain the origin of urban scaling laws". Examples include Arbesman et al.'s 2009 model, Bettencourt's 2013 model, Gomez-Lievano et al.'s 2017 model, and Yang et al.'s 2019 model, among others (see for a more thorough review of the models). The ultimate explanation of scaling laws observed in cities is still debated.

Recent studies argue that the scaling of urban indicators reflects how cities are embedded in commuting networks: inter-city commuter flows help explain urban wealth scaling; inter-city firm connections help explain why some cities outperform population-based predictions of economic output and innovation; disease incidence across cities is also shaped by the strength of commuting ties; and commuter inflows also contribute to the scaling of urban crime.

== Pioneering work ==
=== Santa Fe Institute's cities group ===
- Luis Bettencourt, Geoffrey West, Jose Lobo, and their colleagues at the Santa Fe Institute, conducted seminal work on urban scaling. They identified consistent scaling laws across cities worldwide, showing that larger cities tend to be more innovative and productive but also face challenges such as increased crime rates and disease spread.
- Their research demonstrated that many urban characteristics, from GDP to infrastructure, follow predictable scaling patterns. For example, they found that economic indicators typically have a superlinear scaling exponent ($\beta\approx1.15$), while infrastructure shows sublinear scaling ($\beta\approx0.85$).
- They started the research field of urban scaling with the explicit goal of understanding the power-law relationship between aggregate urban metrics and population size.

=== Economics ===
Some early studies in economics can be seen to have contributed to early stages of the urban scaling literature (unintendedly) by their analyses of how economic outcomes change with population size. One such study is Sveikauskas' 1975 "The productivity of cities", in which he reports a positive association between the average productivity of workers and city population size.

Today, urban economics is a thriving field within economics, focused on understanding cities. The organizing idea for urban economists is the concept of "agglomeration economies", which refers to the causal underpinnings of the benefits and costs that accrue when people come together in physical space. Of particular relevance for understanding the phenomenon of urban scaling, a big body of literature in urban economics investigates the so-called "urban wage premium", which is the empirical observation that nominal wages tend to be larger in larger cities.

=== Sociology ===
The field of sociology has also investigated the relationship between socioeconomic variables and the size and density of populations.

For example, Émile Durkheim, a French sociologist, highlighted the sociological impacts of population density and growth in his 1893 dissertation, "The Division of Labour in Society." In his work, Durkheim emphasized the collective social effects of population. He proposed that an increase in population leads to more social interactions, resulting in competition, specialization, and eventually conflict, which then necessitates the development of social norms and integration. This concept, known as "dynamic density," was later expanded by American sociologist Louis Wirth, particularly in the context of urban settings. However, it wasn't until the 1970s that these ideas were translated into (sociological) mathematical models, sparking debates among sociologists about the complexities of urban agglomeration.

Critics like Claude S. Fischer argued that mathematical models oversimplified the reality of social interactions in cities. Fischer contended that these models assumed urbanites interact randomly, akin to marbles in a jar, which fails to capture the nuanced and localized nature of city life. He pointed out that most city dwellers have limited interactions within their neighborhoods and rarely venture into other parts of the city, contradicting the notion that social interactions scale uniformly with population size. Fischer's criticism emphasized the need for a deeper understanding of social systems, beyond mere quantitative models.

== Criticisms of urban scaling theory ==
Since the formulation of the urban scaling hypothesis, several researchers from the complexity field have criticized the framework and its approach. These criticisms often target the statistical methods used, suggesting that the relationship between economic output and city size may not be a power law. For instance, Shalizi (2011) argues that other functions could fit the relationship between urban characteristics and population equally well, challenging the notion of scale invariance. Bettencourt et al. (2013) responded that while other models might fit the data, the power-law hypothesis remains robust without a better theoretical alternative.

Other critiques by Leitão et al. (2016) and Altmann (2020) pointed out potential misspecifications in the statistical analysis, such as incorrect distribution assumptions and the independence of observations. These concerns highlight the need for theory to guide the choice of statistical methods. Additionally, the issue of defining city boundaries raises conceptual challenges. Arcaute et al. (2015) and subsequent studies showed that different boundary definitions yield different scaling exponents, questioning the premise of agglomeration economies. They suggest that models should consider the intra-city composition of economic and social activities rather than relying solely on aggregate measures.

Another criticism of the urban scaling approach relates to the over-reliance on averages in measuring individual-level quantities such as average wages, or average number of patents produced. Complex systems, such as cities, exhibit distributions of their individual components that are often heavy-tailed. Heavy-tailed distributions are very different from normal distributions, and tend to generate extremely large values. The presence of extreme outliers can invalidate the law of large numbers, making averages unreliable. Gomez-Lievano et al. (2021) showed that in log-normally distributed urban quantities (such as wages), averages only make sense for sufficiently large cities. Otherwise, artificial correlations between city size and productivity can emerge, misleadingly suggesting the appearance of urban scaling.

== Further materials ==
- Bettencourt, L. M. A., Lobo, J., Helbing, D., Kühnert, C., & West, G. B. (2007). Growth, innovation, scaling, and the pace of life in cities. Proceedings of the National Academy of Sciences, 104(17), 7301–7306.
- Bettencourt, L. M. A. (2013). The origins of scaling in cities. Science, 340(6139), 1438–1441.
- Bettencourt, L. M. A., & West, G. B. (2010). A unified theory of urban living. Nature, 467(7318), 912–913.
- The surprising math of cities and corporations – TED Talk
- "Scale: The Universal Laws of Growth, Innovation, Sustainability, and the Pace of Life in Organisms, Cities, Economies, and Companies", by Geoffrey B. West

== See also ==
- Urban economics
- Regional science
- Power law
- Complex system
- Santa Fe Institute
