= Jeff West =

Jeff West, Jeffrey West, or Geoffrey West may be:

- Geoffrey West (born 1940), British physicist
- Jeff West (American football) (born 1953), American football player
- Jeffrey James West (1950–2022), British clergyman and historian of buildings
- Jeffrey K. West (born 1950), British historian of buildings
