= Kleiber's law =

Approximate power law relating animal metabolic rate to mass

Kleiber's plot comparing body size to metabolic rate for a variety of species.

Kleiber's law, named after Max Kleiber for his biological research in the early 1930s, states that, in the vast majority of cases, the basal metabolic rate scales to the 3/4 power of the animal's mass.

More precisely: using w to denote the mass of the animal in kilograms, then BMR ≈ 70w^{3/4} kilocalories per day, or BMR ≈ 3.4w^{3/4} watts.

Thus, over the same time span, a cat having a mass 100 times that of a mouse will consume only about 32 times the energy the mouse uses.

It is presently unclear if the value of the exponent in Kleiber's law is correct, in part because the law currently lacks a single theoretical explanation that is entirely satisfactory.

More recently, Kleiber's law has also been shown to apply in plants, suggesting that Kleiber's observation is much more general.

== Proposed explanations for the law ==
Kleiber's law, like many other biological allometric laws, is a consequence of the physics and/or geometry of circulatory systems in biology. Max Kleiber first discovered the law when analyzing a large number of independent studies on respiration within individual species. Kleiber expected to find an exponent of 2/3 (for reasons explained below), and was confounded by the discovery of a 3/4 exponent.

=== Historical context and the 2/3 scaling surface law ===
Before Kleiber's observation of the 3/4 power scaling, a 2/3 power scaling was largely anticipated based on the "surface law", which states that the basal metabolism of animals differing in size is nearly proportional to their respective body surfaces. This surface law reasoning originated from simple geometrical considerations. As organisms increase in size, their volume (and thus mass) increases at a much faster rate than their surface area. Explanations for 2/3-scaling tend to assume that metabolic rates scale to avoid heat exhaustion. Because bodies lose heat passively via their surface but produce heat metabolically throughout their mass, the metabolic rate must scale in such a way as to counteract the square–cube law. Because many physiological processes, like heat loss and nutrient uptake, were believed to be dependent on the surface area of an organism, it was hypothesized that metabolic rate would scale with the 2/3 power of body mass. Rubner (1883) first demonstrated the law in accurate respiration trials on dogs.

=== Kleiber's contribution ===
Max Kleiber challenged this notion in the early 1930s. Through extensive research on various animals' metabolic rates, he found that a 3/4 power scaling provided a better fit to the empirical data than the 2/3 power. His findings provided the groundwork for understanding allometric scaling laws in biology, leading to the formulation of the Metabolic Scaling Theory and the later work by West, Brown, and Enquist, among others.

Such an argument does not address the fact that different organisms exhibit different shapes (and hence have different surface-area-to-volume ratios, even when scaled to the same size). Reasonable estimates for organisms' surface area do appear to scale linearly with the metabolic rate.

=== Exponent 3/4 ===
West, Brown, and Enquist (hereafter WBE) proposed a general theory for the origin of many allometric scaling laws in biology. According to the WBE theory, 3/4-scaling arises because of efficiency in nutrient distribution and transport throughout an organism. In most organisms, metabolism is supported by a circulatory system featuring branching tubules (i.e., plant vascular systems, insect tracheae, or the human cardiovascular system). WBE claim that (1) metabolism should scale proportionally to nutrient flow (or, equivalently, total fluid flow) in this circulatory system and (2) in order to minimize the energy dissipated in transport, the volume of fluid used to transport nutrients (i.e., blood volume) is a fixed fraction of body mass. The model assumes that the energy dissipated is minimized and that the terminal tubes do not vary with body size. It provides a complete analysis of numerous anatomical and physiological scaling relations for circulatory systems in biology that generally agree with empirical data. More generally, the model predicts the structural and functional properties of vertebrate cardiovascular and respiratory systems, plant vascular systems, insect tracheal tubes, and other distribution networks.

They then analyze the consequences of these two claims at the level of the smallest circulatory tubules (capillaries, alveoli, etc.). Experimentally, the volume contained in those smallest tubules is constant across a wide range of masses. Because fluid flow through a tubule is determined by the volume thereof, the total fluid flow is proportional to the total number of smallest tubules. Thus, if B denotes the basal metabolic rate, Q the total fluid flow, and N the number of minimal tubules,
$$B\propto Q\propto N\text{.}$$
Circulatory systems do not grow by simply scaling proportionally larger; they become more deeply nested. The depth of nesting depends on the self-similarity exponents of the tubule dimensions, and the effects of that depth depend on how many "child" tubules each branching produces. Connecting these values to macroscopic quantities depends (very loosely) on a precise model of tubules. WBE show that if the tubules are well approximated by rigid cylinders, then, to prevent the fluid from "getting clogged" in small cylinders, the total fluid volume V satisfies
$$N^4\propto V^3\text{.}$$
(Despite conceptual similarities, this condition is inconsistent with Murray's law.) Because blood volume is a fixed fraction of body mass,
$$B\propto M^{\frac{3}{4}}\text{.}$$

=== Non-power-law scaling ===
The WBE theory predicts that the scaling of metabolism is not a strict power law but rather should be slightly curvilinear. The 3/4 exponent holds exactly only in the limit of organisms of infinite size. As body size increases, WBE predict that the scaling of metabolism will converge to a ~3/4 scaling exponent. Indeed, WBE predicts that the metabolic rates of the smallest animals tend to be greater than expected from the power-law scaling. Further, metabolic rates for smaller animals (birds under 10 kg [22 lb], or insects) typically fit to 2/3 much better than 3/4; for larger animals, the reverse holds. As a result, log-log plots of metabolic rate versus body mass can "curve" slightly upward, and fit better to quadratic models. In all cases, local fits exhibit exponents in the [2/3,3/4] range.

==== Elaborated and Modified circulatory models ====
Elaborations of the WBE model predict larger scaling exponents, worsening the discrepancy with observed data. However, one can retain a similar theory by relaxing WBE's assumption of a nutrient transport network that is both fractal and circulatory. Different networks are less efficient in that they exhibit a lower scaling exponent. Still, a metabolic rate determined by nutrient transport will always exhibit scaling between 2/3 and 3/4. WBE argued that fractal-like circulatory networks are likely under strong stabilizing selection to evolve to minimize energy used for transport. If selection for greater metabolic rates is favored, then smaller organisms will prefer to arrange their networks to scale as 2/3. Still, selection for larger-mass organisms will tend to result in networks that scale as 3/4, which produces the observed curvature.

==== Modified thermodynamic models ====
An alternative model notes that metabolic rate does not solely serve to generate heat. Metabolic rate contributing solely to useful work should scale with power 1 (linearly), whereas metabolic rate contributing to heat generation should be limited by surface area and scale with power 2/3. Basal metabolic rate is then the convex combination of these two effects: if the proportion of useful work is f, then the basal metabolic rate should scale as
$$B=f\cdot kM+(1-f)\cdot k'M^{\frac{2}{3}}$$
where k and k′ are constants of proportionality. k′ in particular describes the surface area ratio of organisms and is approximately 0.1 kJ·h^{−1}·g^{−2/3}; typical values for f are 15-20%. The theoretical maximum value of f is 21%, because the efficiency of glucose oxidation is only 42%, and half of the ATP so produced is wasted.

=== Mass, Metabolism and Length Explanation (MMLE) ===
As an alternative to statistical power laws that rely on species-averaged datasets, the Mass, Metabolism and Length Explanation (MMLE) framework seeks to calculate metabolic scaling deterministically for individual organisms. The model posits that basal metabolic rate (BMR) is directly proportional to an animal's total mitochondrial count, separating body mass into skeletal musculature governed by dynamic similarity (where mitochondria are uniformly distributed) and non-skeletal tissues (where mitochondria are concentrated in surfaces bounding material with few mitochondria, such as the heart). Rather than using standard power-law parameters, MMLE derives absolute mass and BMR using an individual's structural sturdiness factor and a characteristic length related to its locomotion physics. Together with the sturdiness factor, this characteristic length is used to compute an individual's BMR, non-skeletal tissue mass, and skeletal musculature mass based on the Strouhal or Froude dynamic similarity applicable to its mode of locomotion.

== Criticism of explanations ==
Kozłowski and Konarzewski have argued against attempts to explain Kleiber's law via any sort of limiting factor because metabolic rates vary by factors of 4–5 between rest and activity. Hence, any limits that affect the scaling of the basal metabolic rate would make elevated metabolism — and hence all animal activity — impossible. WBE conversely argue that natural selection can indeed select for minimal transport energy dissipation during rest, without abandoning the ability for less efficient function at other times.

Other researchers have also noted that Kozłowski and Konarzewski's criticism of the law tends to focus on precise structural details of the WBE circulatory networks but that the latter are not essential to the model.

== Experimental support ==
Analyses of variance for a variety of physical variables suggest that although most variation in basal metabolic rate is determined by mass, additional variables with significant effects include body temperature and taxonomic order.

A 1932 work by Brody calculated that the scaling was approximately 0.73.

A 2004 analysis of field metabolic rates for mammals conclude that they appear to scale with exponent 0.749.

== Generalizations ==
Kleiber's law has been reported to interspecific comparisons and has been claimed not to apply at the intraspecific level. The taxonomic level that body mass metabolic allometry should be studied has been debated. Nonetheless, several analyses suggest that while the exponents of the Kleiber's relationship between body size and metabolism can vary at the intraspecific level, statistically, intraspecific exponents in both plants and animals tend to cluster around 3/4.

=== In other kingdoms ===
A 1999 analysis concluded that biomass production in a given plant scaled with the 3/4 power of the plant's mass during the plant's growth, but a 2001 paper that included various types of unicellular photosynthetic organisms found scaling exponents intermediate between 0.75 and 1.00. Similarly, a 2006 paper in Nature argued that the exponent of mass is close to 1 for plant seedlings, but that variation among species, phyla, and growth conditions overwhelm any "Kleiber's law"-like effects. But, metabolic scaling theory can successfully resolve these apparent exceptions and deviations. For finite-size corrections in networks with both area-preserving and area-increasing branching, the WBE model predicts that fits to data for plants yield scaling exponents that are steeper than 3/4 in small plants but then converge to 3/4 in larger plants.

=== Intra-organismal results ===
Because cell protoplasm appears to have constant density across a range of organism masses, a consequence of Kleiber's law is that, in larger species, less energy is available to each cell volume. Cells appear to cope with this difficulty via choosing one of the following two strategies: smaller cells or a slower cellular metabolic rate. Neurons and adipocytes exhibit the former; every other type of cell, the latter. As a result, different organs exhibit different allometric scalings.

Allometric scalings for BMR-vs.-mass in human tissue
Organ	Scaling exponent
Brain	0.7
Kidney	0.85
Liver	0.87
Heart	0.98
Muscle	1.0
Skeleton	1.1

== See also ==
- Allometric law
- Evolutionary physiology
- Metabolic theory of ecology
- Rate-of-living theory
- Scaling law
