= Morphology (biology) =

Study of external forms and structures of organisms

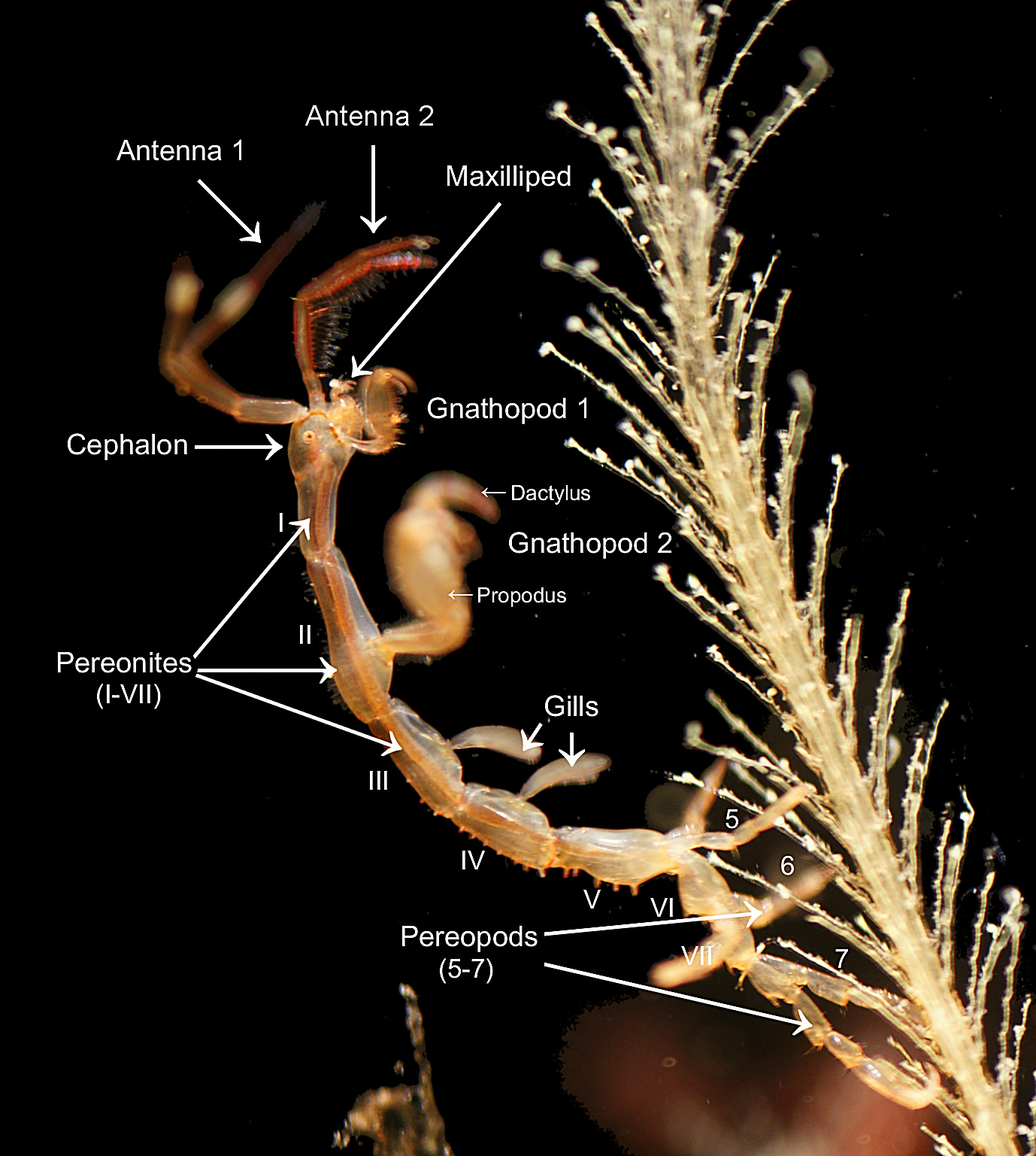
Morphology of a male skeleton shrimp, Caprella mutica

In biology, morphology is the study of the form and structure of organisms and their specific structural features.

This includes aspects of the outward appearance (shape, structure, color, pattern, size), as well as the form and structure of internal parts like bones and organs, i.e., anatomy. This is in contrast to physiology, which deals primarily with function. Morphology is a branch of life science dealing with the study of the overall structure of an organism or taxon and its component parts.

== History ==
The etymology of the word morphology is from the Ancient Greek μορφή (morphḗ), meaning 'form', and λόγος (lógos), meaning 'word, study, research'.

While the concept of form in biology, opposed to function, dates back to Aristotle, the field of morphology was developed by Johann Wolfgang von Goethe and independently by the German anatomist and physiologist Karl Friedrich Burdach.

Among other important theorists of morphology are Lorenz Oken, Georges Cuvier, Étienne Geoffroy Saint-Hilaire, Richard Owen, Carl Gegenbaur and Ernst Haeckel.

In 1830, Cuvier and Saint-Hilaire engaged in a famous debate, which is said to exemplify the two major deviations in biological thinking at the time—whether animal structure was due to function or evolution.

== Divisions of morphology ==
- Comparative morphology is an analysis of the patterns of the locus of structures within the body plan of an organism and forms the basis of taxonomical categorization.
- Functional morphology is the study of the relationship between the structure and function of morphological features.
- Experimental morphology is the study of the effects of external factors upon the morphology of organisms under experimental conditions, such as the effect of genetic mutation.
- Anatomy is a "branch of morphology that deals with the structure of organisms".
- Molecular morphology is a rarely used term, usually referring to the superstructure of polymers such as fiber formation or to larger composite assemblies. The term is commonly not applied to the spatial structure of individual molecules.
- Gross morphology refers to the collective structures of an organism as a whole as a general description of the form and structure of an organism, taking into account all of its structures without specifying an individual structure.

== Morphology and classification ==
Most taxa differ morphologically from other taxa. Typically, closely related taxa differ much less than more distantly related ones, but there are exceptions to this. Cryptic species are species which look very similar, or perhaps even outwardly identical, but are reproductively isolated. Conversely, sometimes unrelated taxa acquire a similar appearance as a result of convergent evolution or even mimicry. In addition, there can be morphological differences within a species, such as in Apoica flavissima where queens are significantly smaller than workers. A further problem with relying on morphological data is that what may appear morphologically to be two distinct species may in fact be shown by DNA analysis to be a single species. The significance of these differences can be examined through the use of allometric engineering in which one or both species are manipulated to phenocopy the other species.

A step relevant to the evaluation of morphology between traits/features within species, includes an assessment of the terms: homology and homoplasy. Homology between features indicates that those features have been derived from a common ancestor. Alternatively, homoplasy between features describes those that can resemble each other, but derive independently via parallel or convergent evolution.

== 3D cell morphology: classification ==
The invention and development of microscopy enabled the observation of 3-D cell morphology with both high spatial and temporal resolution. The dynamic processes of this cell morphology which are controlled by a complex system play an important role in varied important biological processes, such as immune and invasive responses.

== See also ==
- Comparative anatomy
- Computational anatomy
- Insect morphology
- Morphometrics
- Neuromorphology
- Phenetics
- Phenotype
- Phenotypic plasticity
- Plant morphology
