= CREA =

CREA or Crea may refer to:

== People ==
- CREA, pseudonym of the female Japanese singer Ayumi Hamasaki (born 1978)
- Crea (wrestler), Kurea Tsukada (born 2000), Japanese professional wrestler

== Places ==
- Agglomeration community of Rouen-Elbeuf-Austreberthe (CREA; French: Communauté d'agglomération Rouen-Elbeuf-Austreberthe)
- Sacro Monte di Crea, a sacro monte (lit. 'sacred mount') near Serralunga di Crea, Piedmont, Italy
- Serralunga di Crea, a municipality in Piedmont, Italy

== Groups, organizations ==
- Canadian Real Estate Association
- Centre de Recherche en Epistémologie Appliquée (CREA, Paris; French: Applied Epistemology Research Centre)
- Centre for Research on Energy and Clean Air, (CREA, Helsinki) an NGO think tank, quoted by the BBC
- Council of Republicans for Environmental Advocacy
- Creating Resources for Empowerment in Action, a feminist human rights organization based in Delhi, India; co-founded by Geetanjali Misra

== Other uses ==
- Cranial evolutionary allometry
- Honda CHF50 motorscooter, known as the "Crea" in Japan
