= Geoffrey West =

British theoretical physicist

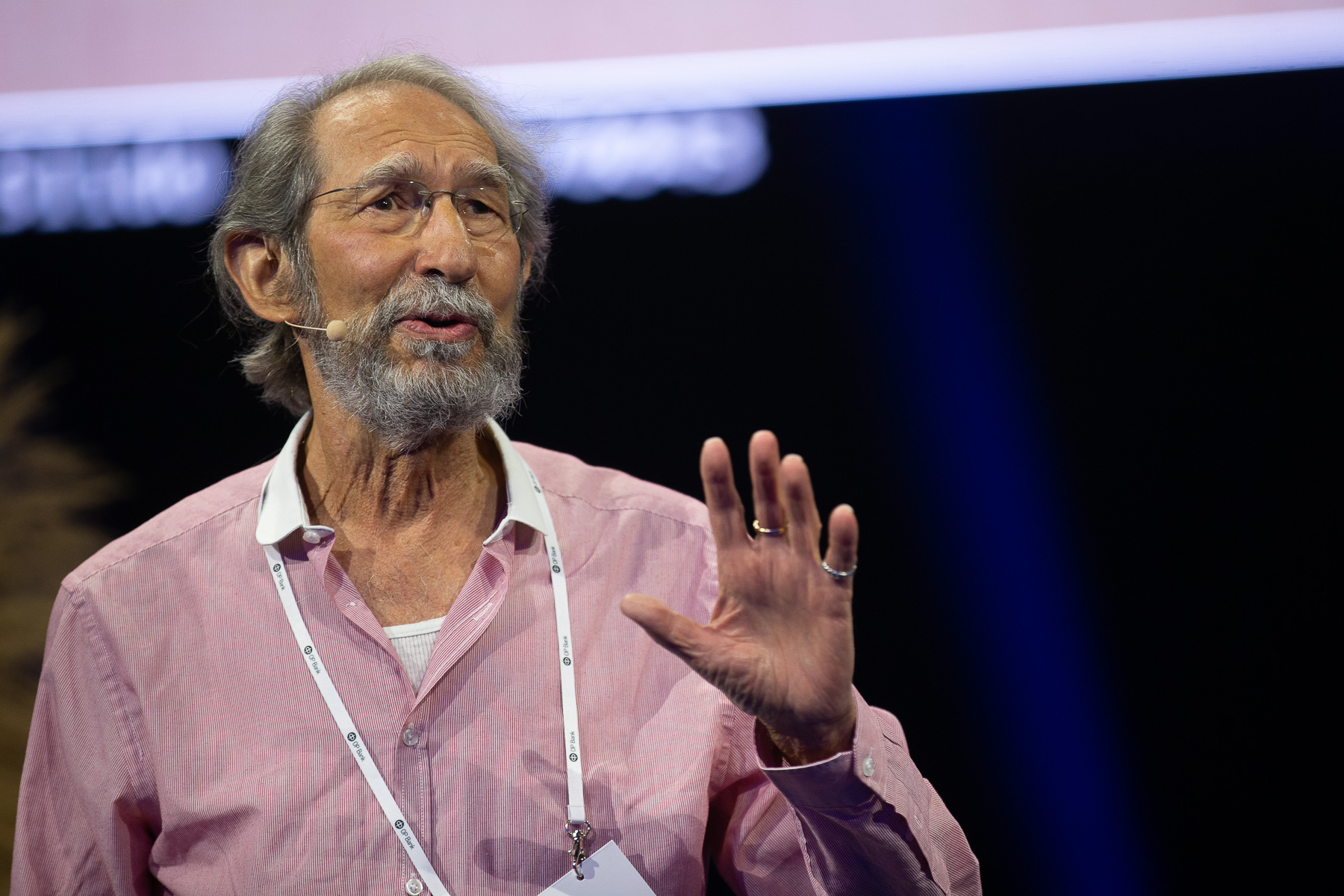
- Born: Geoffrey Brian West; 15 December 1940 (age 85); Taunton, Somerset, United Kingdom
- Education: University of Cambridge; Stanford University
- Known for: Metabolic theory of ecology
- Spouse: Jacqueline West
- Awards: Weldon Memorial Prize (2005)
- Scientific career
- Fields: Theoretical physics Theoretical biology
- Workplaces: Santa Fe Institute; Los Alamos National Laboratory; University of New Mexico
- Thesis: I. Form Factors of the Three-Body Nuclei II. Coulomb Scattering and the Form Factor of the Pion (1966)
- Website: santafe.edu/about/people/profile/Geoffrey%20West

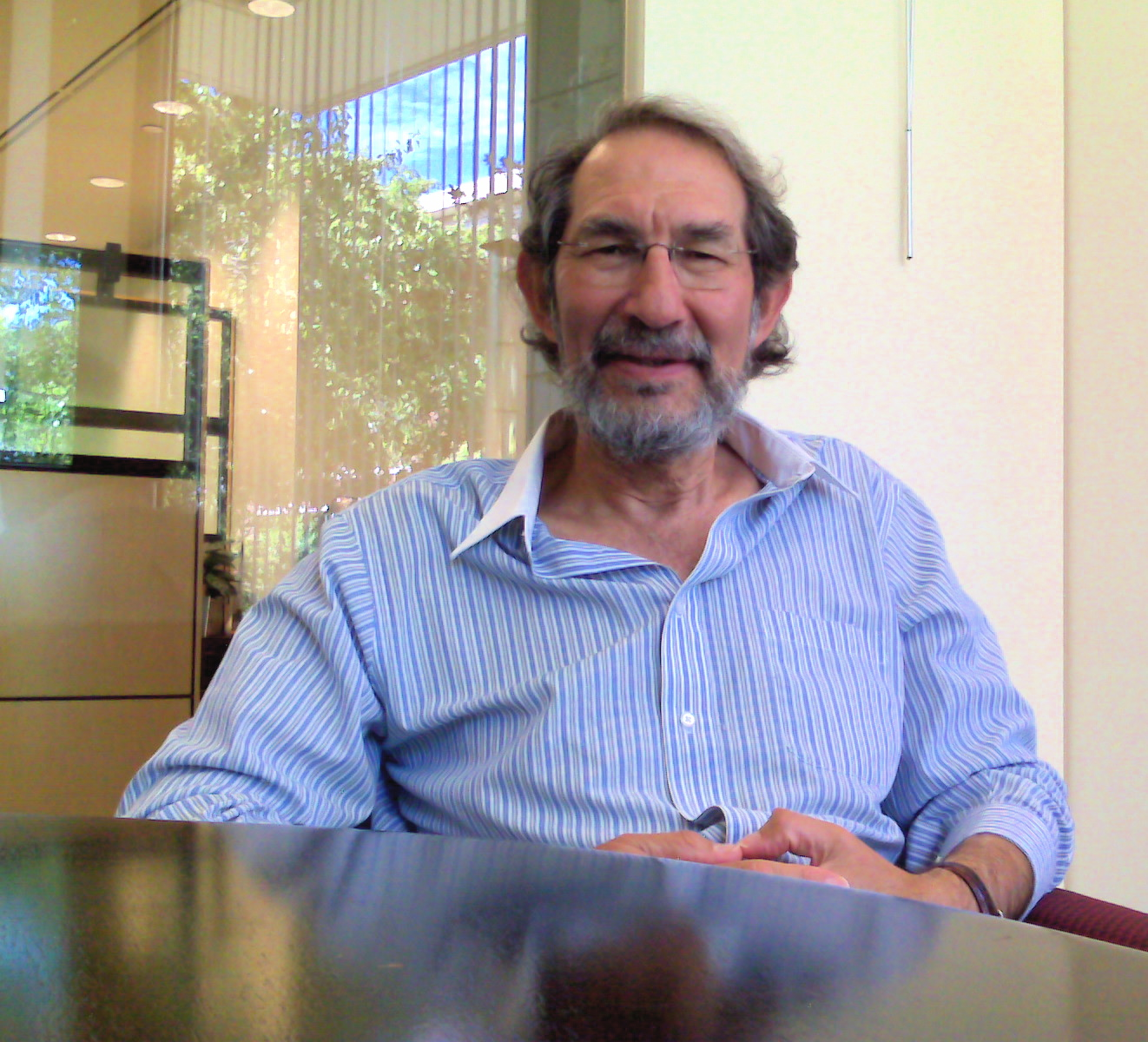

Geoffrey Brian West (born 15 December 1940) is a British theoretical physicist and former president and distinguished professor of the Santa Fe Institute. He is one of the leading scientists working on a scientific model of cities (see also, urban scaling). Among other things, his work states that with the doubling of a city's population, salaries per capita will generally increase by 15%.

== Biography ==
Born in Taunton, Somerset, a rural town in western England, West moved to London when he was 13. He received a Bachelor of Arts degree in physics from the University of Cambridge and pursued graduate studies on the pion at Stanford University.

West became a Stanford faculty member before he joined the particle theory group at New Mexico's Los Alamos National Laboratory. After Los Alamos, he became president of the Santa Fe Institute, where he worked and works on biological issues such as the allometric law and other power laws in biology.

West has since been honoured as one of Time magazine's Time 100. He is a member of the World Knowledge Dialogue Scientific Board.

== See also ==
- Through the Wormhole#Season 3 (2012)

== Selected publications ==
- Necia Grant Cooper, Geoffrey B. West (eds.) Particle Physics: A Los Alamos Primer. CUP Archive, 29 April 1988.
- Brown, James H., and Geoffrey B. West, eds. Scaling in biology. Oxford University Press, 2000.
- West, Geoffrey (2017). Scale: the universal laws of growth, innovation, sustainability, and the pace of life in organisms, cities, economies, and companies. London, United Kingdom: Penguin Press. ISBN 978-178022559-3.

Articles (selection)

- West, Geoffrey B.; Brown, James H.; Enquist, Brian J. (1997). "A general model for the origin of allometric scaling laws in biology" (PDF). Science. 276 (5309): 122–126. doi:10.1126/science.276.5309.122. PMID 9082983. S2CID 3140271.
- West, Geoffrey B., James H. Brown, and Brian J. Enquist. "The fourth dimension of life: fractal geometry and allometric scaling of organisms." science 284.5420 (1999): 1677–1679.
- West, Geoffrey B., James H. Brown, and Brian J. Enquist. "A general model for the structure and allometry of plant vascular systems." Nature 400.6745 (1999): 664–667.
- Gillooly, J. F.; Brown, J. H.; West, G. B.; Savage, V. M.; Charnov, E. L. (2001). "Effects of size and temperature on metabolic rate" (PDF). Science. 293 (5538): 2248–2251. Bibcode:2001Sci...293.2248G. doi:10.1126/science.1061967. PMID 11567137. S2CID 234618. Archived from the original (PDF) on 4 March 2016.
- Brown, J. H.; Gillooly, J. F.; Allen, A. P.; Savage, V. M.; West, G. B. (2004). "Toward a metabolic theory of ecology" (PDF). Ecology. 85 (7): 1771–1789. doi:10.1890/03-9000. Archived from the original (PDF) on 6 January 2012.
- Bettencourt, L. M., Lobo, J., Helbing, D., Kühnert, C., & West, G. B. (2007). "Growth, innovation, scaling, and the pace of life in cities." Proceedings of the national academy of sciences, 104(17), 7301–7306.
- West, Geoffrey (May 2013). "Wisdom in numbers". Forum. Scientific American. 308 (5): 7. Bibcode:2013SciAm.308e..14W. doi:10.1038/scientificamerican0513-14. PMID 23627205.
