= Square–cube law =

Relation between surface area and volume as size increases

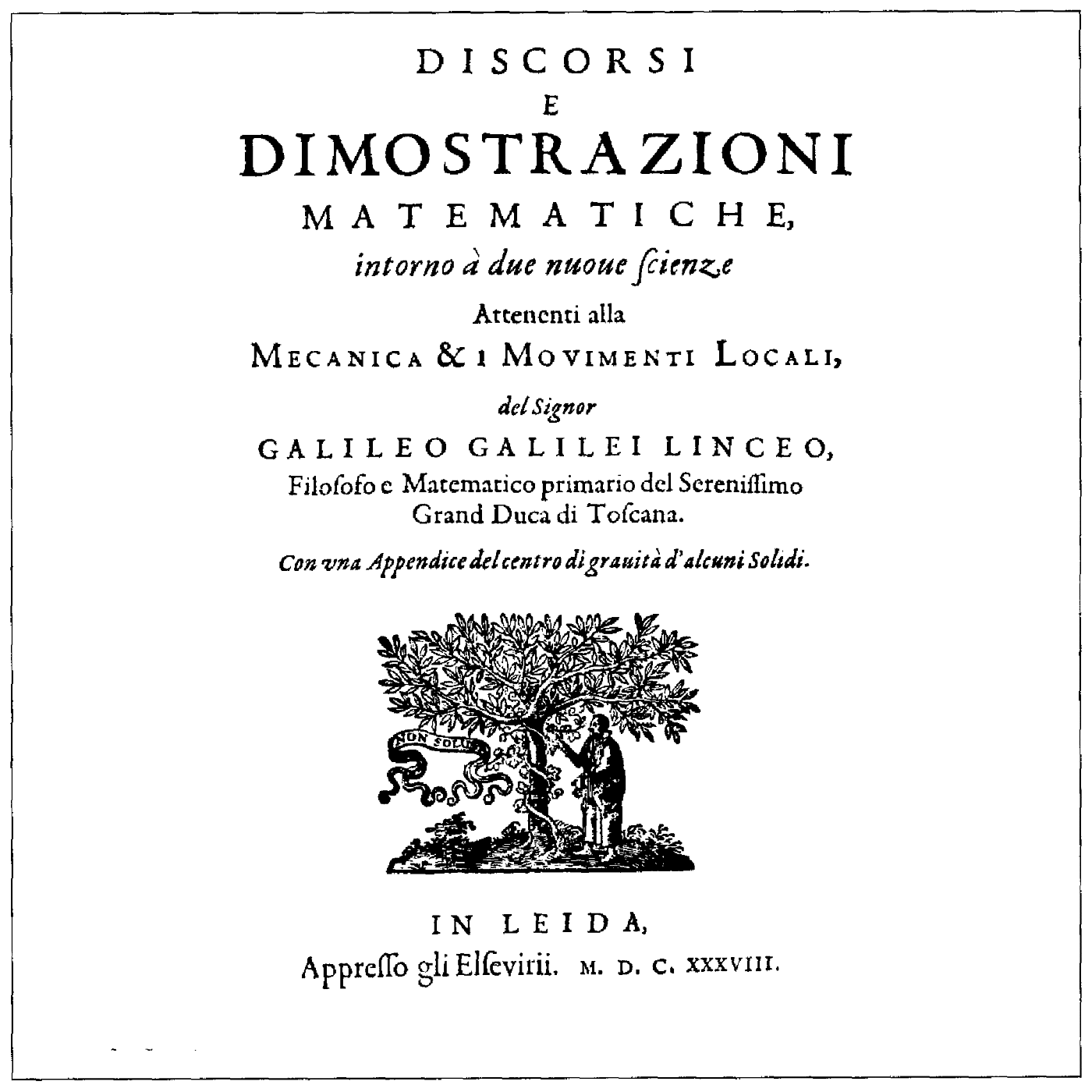
The square–cube law was first mentioned in Two New Sciences (1638).

The square–cube law (or cube–square law) is a mathematical principle, applied in a variety of scientific fields, which describes the relationship between the volume and the surface area as a shape's size increases or decreases. It was first described in 1638 by Galileo Galilei in his Two New Sciences as the "...ratio of two volumes is greater than the ratio of their surfaces".

This principle states that, as a shape grows in size, its volume grows faster than its surface area. When applied to the real world, this principle has many implications which are important in fields ranging from mechanical engineering to biomechanics. It helps explain phenomena including why large mammals like elephants have a harder time cooling themselves than small ones like mice, and why building taller and taller skyscrapers is increasingly difficult.

== Description ==
Graphs of surface area, A against volume, V of the Platonic solids and a sphere, showing that the surface-area-to-volume ratio decreases with increasing volume. The dashed arrows show that when the volume increases 8 (2³) times, the surface area increases 4 (2²) times.

This picture clarifies the relationship between a polyhedron's side length, its surface area, and its volume.

The square–cube law can be stated as follows:

When an object undergoes a proportional increase in size, its new surface area is proportional to the square of the multiplier and its new volume is proportional to the cube of the multiplier.

Represented mathematically:
$$A_2=A_1\left(\frac{\ell_2}{\ell_1}\right)^2$$
where $A_1$ is the original surface area and $A_2$ is the new surface area.
$$V_2=V_1\left(\frac{\ell_2}{\ell_1}\right)^3$$
where $V_1$ is the original volume, $V_2$ is the new volume, $\ell_1$ is the original length and $\ell_2$ is the new length.

For example, a cube with a side length of 1 meter has a surface area of 6 m^{2} and a volume of 1 m^{3}. If the sides of the cube were multiplied by 2, its surface area would be multiplied by the square of 2 and become 24 m^{2}. Its volume would be multiplied by the cube of 2 and become 8 m^{3}.

The original cube (1 m sides) has a surface area to volume ratio of 6 m^{2} : 1 m^{3}. The larger (2 m sides) cube has a surface area to volume ratio of (24/8) 3 m^{2} : 1 m^{3}. As the dimensions increase, the volume will continue to grow faster than the surface area. Thus the square–cube law. This principle applies to all solids.

== Applications ==
=== Engineering ===
When a physical object maintains the same density and is scaled up, its volume and mass are increased by the cube of the multiplier while its surface area increases only by the square of the same multiplier. This would mean that when the larger version of the object is accelerated at the same rate as the original, more pressure would be exerted on the surface of the larger object.

Consider a simple example of a body of mass $m$, undergoing an acceleration $a$, with a surface area $A$, upon which the accelerating force is acting. The force due to acceleration is $F = m a$ and the pressure is $P = \frac{F}{A} = \frac{m a}{A}$.

Now, consider the object to be exaggerated by a multiplier factor $x$ so that it has a new mass $m' = x^3 m$, and a new surface area $A' = x^2 A$.

The new force due to acceleration is $F' = x^3 m a$ and the resulting pressure is:
$$\begin{align}
P' &= \frac{F'}{A'}\\
&= \frac{x^3 m a}{x^2 A}\\
&= x\ \frac{m a}{A}\\
&= x\ P\\
\end{align}$$

Thus, just scaling up the size of an object, keeping the same material of construction (density), and same acceleration, would increase the pressure by the same scaling factor. This would indicate that the object would have less ability to resist stress and would be more prone to collapse while accelerating.

This is why large vehicles perform poorly in crash tests and why there are theorized limits as to how high buildings can be built. Similarly, the larger an object is, the less other objects would resist its motion, causing its deceleration.

==== Engineering examples ====
- Steam engine: James Watt, working as an instrument maker for the University of Glasgow, was given a scale model Newcomen steam engine to put in working order. Watt recognized the problem as being related to the square–cube law, in that the surface-to-volume ratio of the model's cylinder was greater than that of the much larger commercial engines, leading to excessive heat loss. Experiments with this model led to Watt's famous improvements to the steam engine.

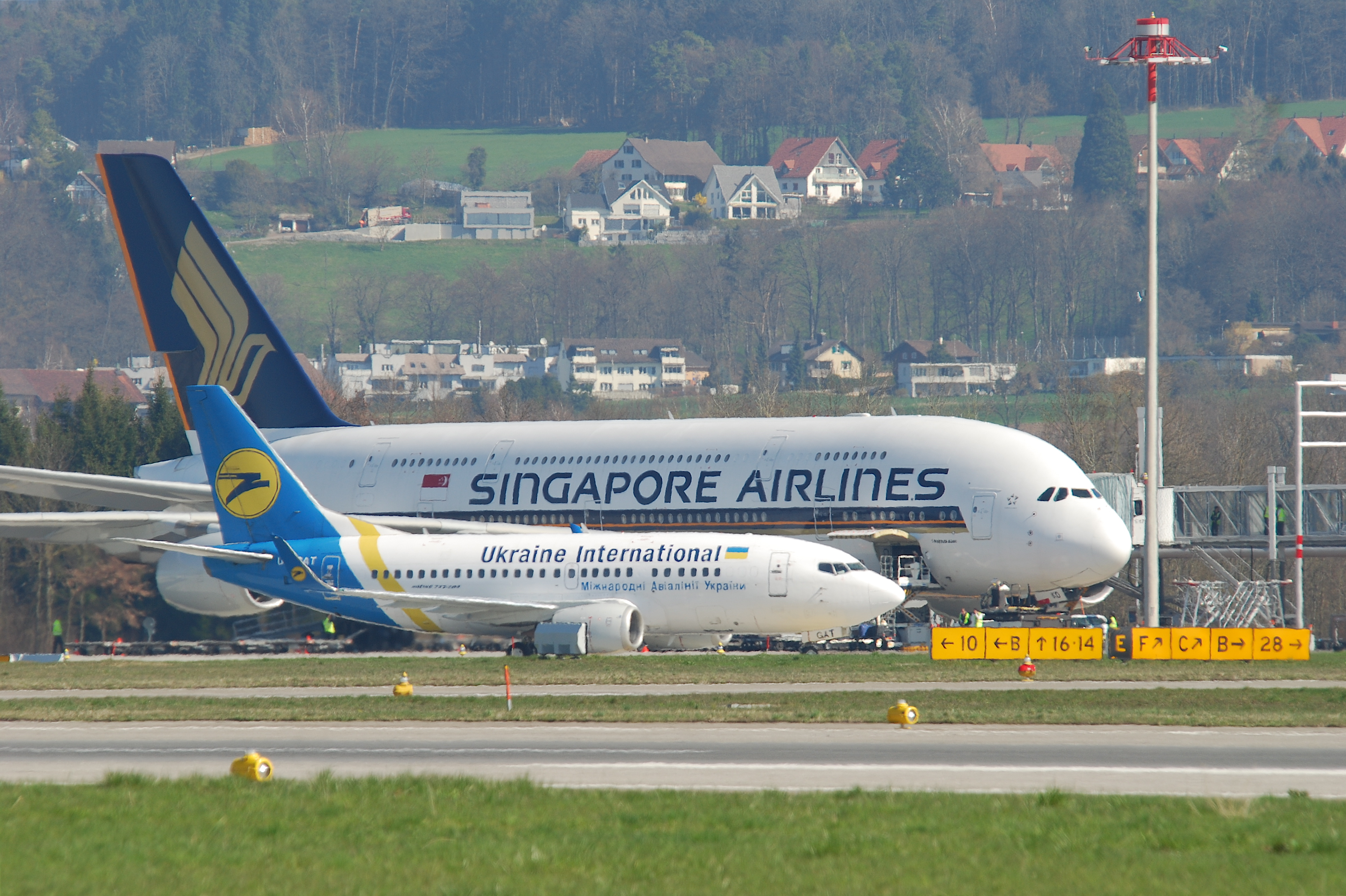
A Boeing 737-500 in front of an Airbus A380

- Airbus A380: the lift and control surfaces (wings, rudders, and elevators) are relatively big compared to the fuselage of the airplane. For example, taking a Boeing 737 and merely magnifying its dimensions to the size of an A380 would result in wings that are too small for the aircraft's weight, because of the square–cube rule.
- Expander cycle rocket engines suffer from the square–cube law. Their size, and therefore thrust, is limited by heat transfer efficiency due to the surface area of the nozzle increasing slower than the volume of fuel flowing through the nozzle.
- A clipper needs relatively more sail surface than a sloop to reach the same speed, meaning there is a higher sail-surface-to-sail-surface ratio between these craft than there is a weight-to-weight ratio.
- Aerostats generally benefit from the square–cube law. As the radius ($r^1$) of a balloon is increased, the cost in surface area increases quadratically ($r^2$), but the lift generated from volume increases cubically ($r^3$).
- Structural engineering: Materials that work at small scales may not work at larger scales. For example, the compressive stress at the bottom of a small free-standing column scales at the same rate as the size of the column. Therefore, there exists a size for a given material and density at which a column will collapse on itself.

=== Biomechanics ===
If an animal were isometrically scaled up by a considerable amount, its relative muscular strength would be severely reduced, since the cross-section of its muscles would increase by the square of the scaling factor while its mass would increase by the cube of the scaling factor. As a result of this, cardiovascular and respiratory functions would be severely burdened.

In the case of flying animals, the wing loading would be increased if they were isometrically scaled up, and they would therefore have to fly faster to gain the same amount of lift. Air resistance per unit mass is also higher for smaller animals (reducing terminal velocity) which is why a small animal like an ant cannot be seriously injured from impact with the ground after being dropped from any height.

As stated by J. B. S. Haldane, large animals do not look like small animals: an elephant cannot be mistaken for a mouse scaled up in size. This is due to allometric scaling: the bones of an elephant are necessarily proportionately much larger than the bones of a mouse because they must carry proportionately higher weight. Haldane illustrates this in his seminal 1928 essay On Being the Right Size in referring to allegorical giants: "...consider a man 60 feet high...Giant Pope and Giant Pagan in the illustrated Pilgrim's Progress: ...These monsters...weighed 1000 times as much as [a normal human]. Every square inch of a giant bone had to support 10 times the weight borne by a square inch of human bone. As the average human thigh-bone breaks under about 10 times the human weight, Pope and Pagan would have broken their thighs every time they took a step." Consequently, most animals show allometric scaling with increased size, both among species and within a species. The giant creatures seen in monster movies (e.g., Godzilla, King Kong, and Them!, and other kaiju) are also unrealistic, given that their sheer size would force them to collapse. Robert Wadlow, the documented tallest man to ever live, with a height of 8 ft 11.1 in (2.72 m), needed leg braces to walk and suffered from numbness in his feet.

However, the buoyancy of water negates to some extent the effects of gravity. Therefore, aquatic animals can grow to very large sizes without the same musculoskeletal structures that would be required of similarly sized terrestrial animals, and it is the primary reason that the largest animals to ever exist on earth are aquatic animals.

The metabolic rate of animals scales with a mathematical principle named quarter-power scaling according to the metabolic theory of ecology.

=== Mass and heat transfer ===
Mass transfer, such as diffusion to smaller objects such as living cells is faster than diffusion to larger objects such as entire animals. Thus, in chemical processes that take place on a surface – rather than in the bulk – finer-divided material is more active. For example, the activity of a heterogeneous catalyst is higher when it is divided into finer particles.

Heat production from a chemical process scales with the cube of the linear dimension (height, width) of the vessel, but the vessel surface area scales with only the square of the linear dimension. Consequently, larger vessels are much more difficult to cool. Also, large-scale piping for transferring hot fluids is difficult to simulate on a small scale, because heat is transferred faster out from smaller pipes. Failure to take this into account in process design may lead to catastrophic thermal runaway.

== See also ==
- Allometric law
- Bergmann's rule
