= Allometric engineering =

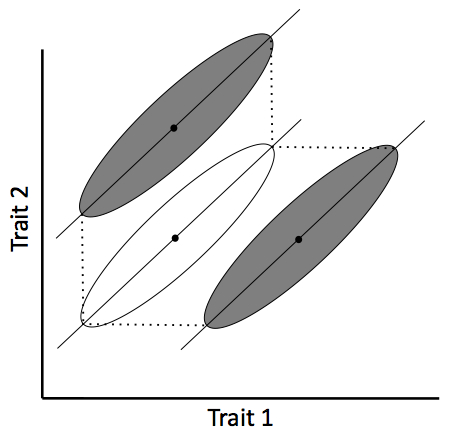
Original population is represented in white and novel engineered populations are shown in grey. Allometric shifts will increase the overall variation in one trait relative to the other breaking their typical correlation

Allometric engineering is the process of experimentally shifting the scaling relationships, for body size or shape, in a population of organisms. More specifically, the process of experimentally breaking the tight covariance evident among component traits of a complex phenotype by altering the variance of one trait relative to another. Typically, body size is one of the two traits. The measurements of the two traits are plotted against each other and the scaling relationship can be represented as: $log(y) = mlog(x) + log(b)$. Manipulations of this sort alter the scaling relationships either by shifting the intercept (b), slope (m) or both to create novel variants (see: Allometry, for more details). These novel variants can then be tested for differences in performance or fitness. Through careful testing, one could sequentially test each component of a trait suite to determine how each part contributes to the function of the entire complex phenotype, and ultimately the fitness of the organism. This technique allows for comparison within or among biological groups differing in size by adjusting morphology to match one another and comparing their performances.

== Examples and application ==
=== Lack's hypothesis ===
Allometric engineering has been used to test David Lack's hypothesis in the lizard Sceloporus occidentalis. In this study, two populations were "engineered" to fit the morphology of the other by manipulating egg yolk quantity, removing effect of size difference between groups. After manipulation, they found that speed was inversely proportional to body size.

=== Nature versus nurture ===
Maternal investment was "allometrically engineered" by surgically removing an ovary in cockroaches (Diploptera punctata). This effectively reduced number of progeny and increased resource allocation to each offspring. They coupled this manipulation with group effects (faster development in large groups), and found that maternal investment can overcome group effect.

=== Sexual selection ===
The male long-tailed widowbird (Euplectes progne) has exceptionally long tail feathers roughly half a meter in length. Male tail feathers were cropped and glued and those with artificially enhanced tail lengths secured the most matings, demonstrating female preference. In the fruit fly Drosophila melanogaster, the posterior lobe of the male genitalia is thought to be used by females to recognize conspecifics. The slope scaling relationship between the lobe and the body is very flat, so that lob size is more-or-less the same size regardless of body size. This is consequence of reduced expression of the forkhead transcription factor FOXO . Increasing expression of FOXO in the male genitalia alone reduces the size of the lobe and reduces male mating success. This demonstrates that the flat scaling of genital size maintains mating success in male flies.

=== Natural selection ===
The fly Zonosemata vittigera has a banding pattern on its wings that was found to mimic movements of a jumping spider. Greene et al. engineered novel phenotypes, breaking correlation between a behavior and morphology, by cutting and transplanting the wings of this fly with the common housefly. This manipulation demonstrated that it was behavior coupled with the banding pattern that deterred jumping spiders from attacking, though not other predators.

== Methods ==
Current uses have involved truncation or cropping, yolk manipulation, hormonal treatments, maternal allocation, temperature manipulation, or altering the nutritional states. Each method undoubtedly has its merits and pitfalls to consider before designing an experiment, but these techniques are opening new avenues of research in comparative and evolutionary biology.

== See also ==
- Allometry
- Cline
- Phenotypic plasticity
