= James Brown (ecologist) =

American biologist and academic (born 1942)

James Hemphill Brown
- Born: September 25, 1942 (age 83); United States
- Education: Cornell University; University of Michigan
- Known for: Macroecology; Metabolic theory of ecology
- Awards: Robert H. MacArthur Award (Ecological Society of America)
- Scientific career
- Fields: Ecology
- Workplaces: University of New Mexico
- Doctoral advisor: Emmet T. Hooper

James Hemphill Brown (born September 25, 1942) is an American biologist and academic known for his contributions to ecology.

Brown is an ecologist and, as of 2001, a Distinguished Professor of Biology at the University of New Mexico. His research has focused on three main areas of ecology:

1. The population and community ecology of rodents and harvester ants in the Chihuahuan Desert.
2. Large-scale ecological patterns, including the distribution of body size, abundance, and geographic range of animals. This work led to the development of macroecology, a term coined in a paper Brown co-authored with Brian Maurer of Michigan State University.
3. The Metabolic Theory of Ecology, which seeks to explain ecological patterns based on metabolic principles.

In 2005, Brown was awarded the Robert H. MacArthur Award by the Ecological Society of America for his contributions to the field, including his work on the metabolic theory of ecology.

Between 1969 and 2011, Brown was awarded over $18.4 million in research grants.

== Education and honors ==
=== Education ===
Brown received a bachelors with honors in 1963 before obtaining his PhD in 1967:

- Bachelor of Arts, Zoology, 1963, Cornell University
- PhD, Zoology, 1967, University of Michigan

=== Honors ===
Honors James Brown has received include:

- American Association for the Advancement of Science, Fellow, 1988
- C. Hart Merriam Award (American Society of Mammalogists) 1989
- Fellow of the American Academy of Arts and Sciences, 1995
- Eugene P. Odum Award for Education (Ecological Society of America), 2001
- Marsh Ward for Career Achievement, (British Ecological Society), 2002
- Robert H. MacArthur Award (Ecological Society of America), 2005
- Member of the National Academy of Sciences, 2005

== Portal ==
In 1977, Brown, in collaboration with Diane Davidson and James Reichman, initiated a research project in the Chihuahuan Desert near Portal, Arizona, to study competition between rodents and ants and their influence on the annual plant community.

== Books ==
- Brown, J.H.; Gibson, A.C. (1983). Biogeography (1st ed.). St. Louis, MO: Mosby.
- Real, L.; Brown, J.H. (1991). Foundations of Ecology. Chicago: University of Chicago Press. ISBN 978-0-226-70594-1.
- Genoways, H.H.; Brown, J.H. (1993). Biology of the Heteromyidae. American Society of Mammalogists. ISBN 978-0-935868-66-1.
- Brown, J.H. (1995). Macroecology. Chicago: University of Chicago Press. ISBN 978-0-226-07615-7.
- Brown, J.H.; Lomolino, M.V. (1998). Biogeography (2nd ed.). Sunderland, MA: Sinauer.
- Brown, J.H.; West, G.B. (2000). Scaling in Biology. Oxford: Oxford University Press. ISBN 978-0-19-513142-0.
- Lomolino, M.V.; Sax, D.F.; Brown, J.H. (2004). Foundations of Biogeography. Chicago: University of Chicago Press. ISBN 978-0-226-49236-0.
- Lomolino, M.V.; Riddle, B.R.; Brown, J.H. (2005). Biogeography (3rd ed.). Sunderland, MA: Sinauer.
- Storch, D.; Marquet, P.A.; Brown, J.H. (2007). Scaling in Biodiversity. New York: Cambridge University Press. ISBN 978-0-521-87602-5.
- Lomolino, M.V.; Riddle, B.R.; Whittaker, R.J.; Brown, J.H. (2009). Biogeography (4th ed.). Sunderland, MA: Sinauer. ISBN 978-0-87893-486-7.
- Smith, F.A.; Gittleman, J.L.; Brown, J.H. (2014). Foundations of Macroecology (1st ed.). Chicago: University of Chicago Press. ISBN 978-0-226-11533-7.

== See also ==
- Metabolic theory of ecology
