= Jeffrey K. West =

British historical buildings specialist

Jeffrey K. West FSA (born April 1950) is a British specialist in historical buildings and artefacts with a concentration on ecclesiastical buildings.

== Education ==
West completed a postgraduate degree at the Courtauld Institute of Art, following which he was awarded a Doctorate in Medieval art and architecture. During his postgraduate study, West took photographs that are now held in the Conway Collection at the Courtauld Institute of Art, London. This collection comprises images of secular and ecclesiastical buildings and is currently being digitised as part of a wider project, Courtauld Connects.

== Scholarship ==
West is currently the chair of the board of trustees of the Stained Glass Museum at Ely Cathedral, a Fellow of the Royal Historical Society, and a Fellow of the Society of Antiquaries of London. He previously served as senior advisor to the Statutory Advisory Committee on Closed and Closing Churches and as secretary to the Redundant Churches Commission.

== Publications ==
West has published and collaborated on several articles on architectural features and patrons for Grove Art Online, the online edition of the Macmillan Dictionary of Art.

"Byzantine Blossom", Grove Art Online (2003)

"Anthemion", Grove Art Online (2003)

"Henry of Blois", Grove Art Online (2003)

"Romanesque", Grove Art Online (2003).

== Personal life ==
West was born in April 1950 in Solihull, West Midlands. In July 1974 he married Jane E. Edwards.
