= Cranial evolutionary allometry =

Theory regarding evolutionary trends in the shape of mammalian skulls

Cranial evolutionary allometry (CREA) is a scientific theory regarding trends in the shape of mammalian skulls during the course of evolution in accordance with body size (i.e., allometry). Specifically, the theory posits that there is a propensity among closely related mammalian groups for the skulls of the smaller species to be short and those of the larger species to be long. This propensity appears to hold true for placental as well as non-placental mammals, and is highly robust. Examples of groups which exhibit this characteristic include antelopes, fruit bats, mongooses, squirrels and kangaroos as well as felids.

It is believed that the reason for this trend has to do with size-related constraints on the formation and development of the mammalian skull. Facial length is one of the best known examples of heterochrony. However, biomechanical principles relating to bite force might also be a major driver of the pattern among species that share similar diets. Because the hardness of a bite is a product of muscle force and leverage, larger species with bigger jaw muscles can bite a given food item with a longer face, but to bite into the same food, smaller species often need to have a shorter face to increase leverage as compensation for their weaker jaw muscles.
