= Macroecology =

Study of relationships between organisms and their environment at large spatial scales

Macroecology is a subfield in ecology that uses a methodological approach that investigates the empirical patterns and mechanistic processes by which the particulate components of complex ecological systems generate emergent structures and dynamics Unlike traditional ecology, which focuses on local and small-scale interactions, macroecology seeks to identify general emergent patterns within and across spatial and temporal scales.

One of the main tenets of macroecology is that, despite the apparent complexity and randomness of ecological systems, they exhibit a significant degree of order. This order is particularly evident in statistical patterns related to organism interactions, their relationships with the environment, and the emergent structures and dynamics of ecological systems. As put by Brown (1999), "Despite their complexity, ecological systems are not haphazard collections of organisms interacting randomly. Instead, they exhibit a great deal of order: in the kinds of organisms that make up the system, like their interactions with each other and their nonliving environment, and especially in the emergent structure and dynamics of the system. This order is perhaps best revealed in certain statistical patterns." Lawton aptly captures the essence of macroecology: "Macroecology ... seeks to get above the mind‐boggling details of local community assembly to find a bigger picture, whereby a kind of statistical order emerges from the scrum.” Thus, macroecology often aims to elucidate statistical patterns of abundance, distribution, and diversity across different biological scales.

The term "macroecology" was first introduced by Venezuelan researchers Guillermo Sarmiento and Maximina Monasterio in 1971 and was later adopted by James Brown and Brian Maurer in their 1989 paper in Science.

Macroecology is not just a large-scale study; a macroecological approach can also be taken at small scales to study emergent behavior. In essence, macroecology adopts a "top-down" approach, focusing on understanding the properties of entire systems (populations, communities, assemblages etc.) rather than individual components. It is akin to seeing the entire forest instead of individual trees, as Kevin Gaston and Tim Blackburn suggested. Some critical areas of interest within macroecology include the study of species richness, latitudinal gradients in species diversity, the species-area curve, range size, body size, and species abundance. Specifically, the relationship between abundance and range size—exploring why some species are widespread and abundant while others are restricted and less common—has been a focal area of macroecological research.
