= Metabolic theory of ecology =

Theory concerning metabolism and observed patterns in ecology

The metabolic theory of ecology (MTE) is the ecological component of the more general West, Brown, and Enquist (WBE) Metabolic Scaling Theory and Kleiber's law. It posits that the metabolic rate of organisms is the fundamental biological rate that governs most observed patterns in ecology. MTE is part of a larger set of theory known as metabolic scaling theory that attempts to provide a unified theory for the importance of metabolism in driving pattern and process in biology from the level of cells all the way to the biosphere.

MTE is based on an interpretation of the relationships between body size, body temperature, and metabolic rate across all organisms. Small-bodied organisms tend to have higher mass-specific metabolic rates than larger-bodied organisms. Furthermore, organisms that operate at warm temperatures through endothermy or by living in warm environments tend towards higher metabolic rates than organisms that operate at colder temperatures. This pattern is consistent from the unicellular level up to the level of the largest animals and plants on the planet.

In MTE, this relationship is considered to be the primary constraint that influences biological processes (via their rates and times) at all levels of organization (from individual up to ecosystem level). MTE is a macroecological theory that aims to be universal in scope and application.

== Fundamental concepts in MTE ==
=== Metabolism ===
Metabolic pathways consist of complex networks, which are responsible for the processing of both energy and material. The metabolic rate of a heterotroph is defined as the rate of respiration in which energy is obtained by oxidation of a carbon compound. The rate of photosynthesis on the other hand, indicates the metabolic rate of an autotroph. According to MTE, both body size and temperature affect the metabolic rate of an organism. Metabolic rate scales as 3/4 power of body size, and its relationship with temperature is described by the Van't Hoff-Arrhenius equation over the range of 0 to 40 °C.

=== Stoichiometry ===
From the ecological perspective, stoichiometry is concerned with the proportion of elements in both living organisms and their environment. In order to survive and maintain metabolism, an organism must be able to obtain crucial elements and excrete waste products. As a result, the elemental composition of an organism would be different from the exterior environment. Through metabolism, body size can affect stoichiometry. For example, small organism tend to store most of their phosphorus in rRNA due to their high metabolic rate, whereas large organisms mostly invest this element inside the skeletal structure. Thus, concentration of elements to some extent can limit the rate of biological processes. Inside an ecosystem, the rate of flux and turn over of elements by inhabitants, combined with the influence of abiotic factors, determine the concentration of elements.

== Theoretical background ==
Metabolic rate scales with the mass of an organism of a given species according to Kleiber's law where B is whole organism metabolic rate (in watts or other unit of power), M is organism mass (in kg), and B_{o} is a mass-independent normalization constant (given in a unit of power divided by a unit of mass. In this case, watts per kilogram):

$$B = B_oM ^ {3/4}\,$$

At increased temperatures, chemical reactions proceed faster. This relationship is described by the Boltzmann factor, where E is activation energy in electronvolts or joules, T is absolute temperature in kelvins, and k is the Boltzmann constant in eV/K or J/K:

$$e^{-\frac{E}{k\,T}}$$

While B_{o} in the previous equation is mass-independent, it is not explicitly independent of temperature. To explain the relationship between body mass and temperature, building on earlier work showing that the effects of both body mass and temperature could be combined multiplicatively in a single equation, the two equations above can be combined to produce the primary equation of the MTE, where b_{o} is a normalization constant that is independent of body size or temperature:

$$B = b_oM^{3/4}e^{-\frac{E}{k\,T}}$$

According to this relationship, metabolic rate is a function of an organism's body mass and body temperature. By this equation, large organisms have higher metabolic rates (in watts) than small organisms, and organisms at high body temperatures have higher metabolic rates than those that exist at low body temperatures. However, specific metabolic rate (SMR, in watts/kg) is given by

$SMR = (B/M) = b_oM^{-1/4}e^{-\frac{E}{k\,T}}$

Hence SMR for large organisms are lower than small organisms.

== Past debate over mechanisms and the allometric exponent ==
Researchers have debated two main aspects of this theory, the pattern and the mechanism. Past debated have focused on the question whether metabolic rate scales to the power of 3/4 or 2/3w, or whether either of these can even be considered a universal exponent. In addition to debates concerning the exponent, some researchers also disagree about the underlying mechanisms generating the scaling exponent. Various authors have proposed at least eight different types of mechanisms that predict an allometric scaling exponent of either 2/3 or 3/4. The majority view is that while the 3/4 exponent is indeed the mean observed exponent within and across taxa, there is intra- and interspecific variability in the exponent that can include shallower exponents such as2/3. Past debates on the exact value of the exponent are settled in part because the observed variability in the metabolic scaling exponent is consistent with a 'relaxed' version of metabolic scaling theory where additional selective pressures lead to a constrained set of variation around the predicted optimal 3/4 exponent.

Much of past debate have focused on two particular types of mechanisms. One of these assumes energy or resource transport across the external surface area of three-dimensional organisms is the key factor driving the relationship between metabolic rate and body size. The surface area in question may be skin, lungs, intestines, or, in the case of unicellular organisms, cell membranes. In general, the surface area (SA) of a three dimensional object scales with its volume (V) as SA = cV^{2/3}, where c is a proportionality constant. The Dynamic Energy Budget model predicts exponents that vary between 2/3 – 1, depending on the organism's developmental stage, basic body plan and resource density. DEB is an alternative to metabolic scaling theory, developed before the MTE. DEB also provides a basis for population, community and ecosystem level processes to be studied based on energetics of the constituent organisms. In this theory, the biomass of the organism is separated into structure (what is built during growth) and reserve (a pool of polymers generated by assimilation). DEB is based on the first principles dictated by the kinetics and thermodynamics of energy and material fluxes, has a similar number of parameters per process as MTE, and the parameters have been estimated for over 3000 animal species "Add my Pet". While some of these alternative models make several testable predictions, others are less comprehensive and of these proposed models only DEB can make as many predictions with a minimal set of assumptions as metabolic scaling theory.

In contrast, the arguments for a 3/4 scaling factor are based on resource transport network models, where the limiting resources are distributed via some optimized network to all resource consuming cells or organelles. These models are based on the assumption that metabolism is proportional to the rate at which an organism's distribution networks (such as circulatory systems in animals or xylem and phloem in plants) deliver nutrients and energy to body tissues. Larger organisms are necessarily less efficient because more resource is in transport at any one time than in smaller organisms: size of the organism and length of the network imposes an inefficiency due to size. It therefore takes somewhat longer for large organisms to distribute nutrients throughout the body and thus they have a slower mass-specific metabolic rate. An organism that is twice as large cannot metabolize twice the energy—it simply has to run more slowly because more energy and resources are wasted being in transport, rather than being processed. Nonetheless, natural selection appears to have minimized this inefficiency by favoring resource transport networks that maximize rate of delivery of resources to the end points such as cells and organelles. This selection to maximize metabolic rate and energy dissipation results in the allometric exponent that tends to D/(D+1), where D is the primary dimension of the system. A three dimensional system, such as an individual, tends to scale to the 3/4 power, whereas a two dimensional network, such as a river network in a landscape, tends to scale to the 2/3 power.

Despite past debates over the value of the exponent, the implications of metabolic scaling theory and the extensions of the theory to ecology (metabolic theory of ecology) the theory might remain true regardless of its precise numerical value.

== Implications of the theory ==
The metabolic theory of ecology's main implication is that metabolic rate, and the influence of body size and temperature on metabolic rate, provide the fundamental constraints by which ecological processes are governed. If this holds true from the level of the individual up to ecosystem level processes, then life history attributes, population dynamics, and ecosystem processes could be explained by the relationship between metabolic rate, body size, and body temperature. While different underlying mechanisms make somewhat different predictions, the following provides an example of some of the implications of the metabolism of individuals.

=== Organism level ===
Small animals tend to grow fast, breed early, and die young. According to MTE, these patterns in life history traits are constrained by metabolism. An organism's metabolic rate determines its rate of food consumption, which in turn determines its rate of growth. This increased growth rate produces trade-offs that accelerate senescence. For example, metabolic processes produce free radicals as a by-product of energy production. These in turn cause damage at the cellular level, which promotes senescence and ultimately death. Selection favors organisms which best propagate given these constraints. As a result, smaller, shorter lived organisms tend to reproduce earlier in their life histories.

=== Population and community level ===
MTE has profound implications for the interpretation of population growth and community diversity. Classically, species are thought of as being either r selected (where populations tend to grow exponentially, and are ultimately limited by extrinsic factors) or K selected (where population size is limited by density-dependence and carrying capacity). MTE explains this diversity of reproductive strategies as a consequence of the metabolic constraints of organisms. Small organisms and organisms that exist at high body temperatures tend to be r selected, which fits with the prediction that r selection is a consequence of metabolic rate. Conversely, larger and cooler bodied animals tend to be K selected. The relationship between body size and rate of population growth has been demonstrated empirically, and in fact has been shown to scale to M^{−1/4} across taxonomic groups. The optimal population growth rate for a species is therefore thought to be determined by the allometric constraints outlined by the MTE, rather than strictly as a life history trait that is selected for based on environmental conditions.

Regarding density, MTE predicts carrying capacity of populations to scale as M^{-3/4}, and to exponentially decrease with increasing temperature. The fact that larger organisms reach carrying capacity sooner than smaller one is intuitive, however, temperature can also decrease carrying capacity due to the fact that in warmer environments, higher metabolic rate of organisms demands a higher rate of supply. Empirical evidence in terrestrial plants, also suggests that density scales as -3/4 power of the body size.

Observed patterns of diversity can be similarly explained by MTE. It has long been observed that there are more small species than large species. In addition, there are more species in the tropics than at higher latitudes. Classically, the latitudinal gradient in species diversity has been explained by factors such as higher productivity or reduced seasonality. In contrast, MTE explains this pattern as being driven by the kinetic constraints imposed by temperature on metabolism. The rate of molecular evolution scales with metabolic rate, such that organisms with higher metabolic rates show a higher rate of change at the molecular level. If a higher rate of molecular evolution causes increased speciation rates, then adaptation and ultimately speciation may occur more quickly in warm environments and in small bodied species, ultimately explaining observed patterns of diversity across body size and latitude.

MTE's ability to explain patterns of diversity remains controversial. For example, researchers analyzed patterns of diversity of New World coral snakes to see whether the geographical distribution of species fit within the predictions of MTE (i.e. more species in warmer areas). They found that the observed pattern of diversity could not be explained by temperature alone, and that other spatial factors such as primary productivity, topographic heterogeneity, and habitat factors better predicted the observed pattern. Extensions of metabolic theory to diversity that include eco-evolutionary theory show that an elaborated metabolic theory can account for differences in diversity gradients by including feedbacks between ecological interactions (size-dependent competition and predation) and evolutionary rates (speciation and extinction)

=== Ecosystem processes ===
At the ecosystem level, MTE explains the relationship between temperature and production of total biomass. The average production to biomass ratio of organisms is higher in small organisms than large ones. This relationship is further regulated by temperature, and the rate of production increases with temperature. As production consistently scales with body mass, MTE provides a framework to assess the relative importance of organismal size, temperature, functional traits, soil and climate on variation in rates of production within and across ecosystems. Metabolic theory shows that variation in ecosystem production is characterized by a common scaling relationship, suggesting that global change models can incorporate the mechanisms governing this relationship to improve predictions of future ecosystem function.

== See also ==
- Allometry
- Constructal theory
- Dynamic energy budget theory
- Ecology
- Evolutionary physiology
- Occupancy-abundance relationship
