= List of Colorado College people =

List of some notable people associated with Colorado College

Coordinates: 38.8479°N 104.8228°W

Location of Colorado College in Colorado

== Notable alumni ==
=== Arts ===
==== Film, theatre, and broadcasting ====
- Neal Baer, television producer/writer and pediatrician
- Dee Bradley Baker, voice actor
- Robert Bogue, actor
- Ken Curtis, singer and actor best known for his role as Festus Haggen on the long-running CBS western television series Gunsmoke
- Jim Dziura, film director, cinematographer, and editor
- Daniel Junge, Academy Award-winning documentary filmmaker (Saving Face)
- Cynthia Lowen, documentary filmmaker (Bully)
- Peter Mortimer, Sports Emmy-winning filmmaker, co-founder of the REEL ROCK Film Tour
- Arden Myrin, comedian and actress
- Doug Pray, Emmy Award-winning film director (Art & Copy)
- Derek Richardson, actor
- Nick Rosen, filmmaker, co-creator of the Emmy-nominated National Geographic series First Ascent
- Steve Sabol, film producer and former president of NFL Films, Pro Football Hall of Fame inductee
- Aaron Shure, Emmy Award-winning television writer, director, and producer (Everybody Loves Raymond, The Office)
- Marc Webb, producer and director of music videos and films such as (500) Days of Summer and The Amazing Spider-Man
- Dean Winters, actor

==== Writers, journalists and publishers ====
- William Brangham, journalist, currently a correspondent for PBS NewsHour
- David Burnett, photojournalist recognized for the World Press Photo of the Year (1980), co-recipient of the Robert Capa Gold Medal, and named Magazine Photographer of the Year by the National Press Photographers Association
- Michael Dahlie, novelist
- Gregg Easterbrook, writer and contributing editor of The New Republic and The Atlantic Monthly
- Frieda Ekotto, francophone African woman novelist and literary critic
- Thomas Hornsby Ferril, poet laureate of Colorado
- Mark Fiore, Pulitzer Prize-winning political cartoonist
- Edward K. Gaylord, publisher of the Daily Oklahoman
- Kaui Hart Hemmings, novelist, author of The Descendants and House of Thieves
- Mabel Barbee Lee, writer
- Reginald McKnight, short story writer and novelist, recipient of the O. Henry Award, the Drue Heinz Literature Prize, and the Whiting Award
- Michael Nava, attorney and writer
- Jen Sincero, author
- Andi Zeisler, journalist and writer

==== Artists and musicians ====
- Herbert Beattie, operatic bass and voice teacher
- Eric Bransby, muralist
- Cecil Effinger, composer, oboist, and inventor
- Jo Estill, singer, singing voice specialist and voice researcher
- Robert Evett, composer and music critic
- Glenna Goodacre, sculptor
- Margaret Kilgallen, Mission School artist and printmaker
- Janet Maguire, composer
- Duard Marshall, painter
- Max Morath, ragtime pianist, composer, actor and author
- Ann Royer, painter, sculptor
- Abigail Washburn, Grammy Award-winning banjo player and singer
- Jeremy Zucker, singer-songwriter

=== Economics and business ===
- Obadiah J. Barker, founder and president of Barker Brothers
- Charles Cicchetti, co-founder of Madison Consulting Group, professor of Economics at the University of Southern California
- Harold Thayer Davis, mathematician, statistician, and econometrician, known for the Davis distribution
- Alexander Ellis III, partner in the venture-capital firm Rockport Capital Partners
- Joe Ellis, president of the Denver Broncos
- Lori Garver, general manager of the Air Line Pilots Association
- James Heckman, winner of 2000 Nobel Prize for Economics, Henry Schultz Distinguished Service Professor of Economics at the University of Chicago, professor of Law at the Law School, and director of the Center for the Economics of Human Development
- Jayne Hrdlicka, CEO of Virgin Australia, and Board President of Tennis Australia
- David Malpass, president of the World Bank
- Sebastian Suhl, former COO of Prada S.p.A.; CEO at Givenchy
- Amy Tucker, inventor of Xeko

=== Government and politics ===
- Patty Pansing Brooks, former Nebraska state legislator
- Liz Cheney, former U.S. representative for Wyoming, daughter of former Vice President Dick Cheney and Second Lady Lynne Cheney
- Lynne Cheney, former Second Lady of the United States, wife of former Vice President Dick Cheney, novelist, conservative scholar, and former talk-show host
- Mary Cheney, former campaign aide, daughter of former Vice President Dick Cheney and Second Lady Lynne Cheney
- Matt Claman, member of the Alaska State Senate and former member of the Alaska House of Representatives
- Marian W. Clarke, former U.S. representative for New York's 34th District
- Diana DeGette, U.S. representative from Colorado's 1st Congressional District
- Myron Ebell, director of Global Warming and International Environmental Policy at the Competitive Enterprise Institute
- Randall Edwards, former Oregon state treasurer
- Jennifer Zimdahl Galt, United States ambassador to Mongolia
- Lori Garver, former deputy administrator of NASA
- Abdul Aziz Abdul Ghani, former prime minister of Yemen
- Harrison Loesch, former assistant secretary of Interior
- Katherine Maraman, associate and chief justice of the Supreme Court of Guam
- Helen Stevenson Meyner, former U.S. representative for New Jersey's 13th District
- Ted Morton, former Minister of Energy for Alberta, former Minister of Finance and Enterprise for Alberta, former Minister of Sustainable Resource Development for Alberta, former member of the Legislative Assembly of Alberta
- Mark Norris, judge of the United States District Court for the Western District of Tennessee, former majority leader of the Tennessee Senate, former Tennessee state senator
- Philip Perry, former acting associate attorney general at Department of Justice, former general counsel of Office of Management and Budget, and former general counsel of Department of Homeland Security
- Frederick Madison Roberts, great-grandson of Sally Hemings, member of the California State Assembly, first African-American elected to public office on the West Coast
- Gregor Robertson, former mayor of Vancouver, former member of the Legislative Assembly of British Columbia
- Ken Salazar, United States ambassador to Mexico, former United States Secretary of the Interior, former United States senator from Colorado, former attorney general of Colorado, former executive director of the Colorado Department of Natural Resources
- Harry H. Seldomridge, former U.S. representative from Colorado's 2nd District
- Maile Shimabukuro, Hawaii state senator
- Joe Simitian, member of the Santa Clara County Board of Supervisors, former California state senator, former member of the California State Assembly, former member of the Palo Alto City Council
- Colin M. Simpson, former speaker of the Wyoming House of Representatives, former member of the Wyoming House of Representatives
- Richard H. Stallings, former chair of the Idaho Democratic Party, former United States Nuclear Waste Negotiator, former U.S. representative from Idaho's 2nd District
- Stuart Stevens, strategist for Mitt Romney's 2012 presidential campaign, co-founder of Washington, D.C.–based political media consultancy Stevens & Schriefer Group
- Timothy Tymkovich, chief judge of the United States Court of Appeals for the Tenth Circuit

=== Academia ===
- William Drea Adams, former president, Colby College and Bucknell University
- Anne Basting, winner of 2016 MacArthur Fellowship, professor of Theater at the University of Wisconsin-Milwaukee
- Johanna Bond, dean of Rutgers Law School
- Charles L. Briggs, Alan Dundes Distinguished Professor of Folklore at the University of California, Berkeley
- Harold Thayer Davis, professor of Mathematics at Northwestern University
- Frieda Ekotto, professor of French, Comparative Literature, Afroamerican and African Studies at the University of Michigan
- Brian J. Enquist, professor of Biology at the University of Arizona
- Paul Franco, Barry N. Wish Professor of Government and Social Studies at Bowdoin College
- Jean Halley, professor of Sociology at the Graduate Center of the City University of New York
- Donna Haraway, professor of Science and Technology Studies in the History of Consciousness Department and the Feminist Studies Department at the University of California, Santa Cruz
- Harlene Hayne CNZM, vice-chancellor and professor of Psychology at the University of Otago
- James Heckman, winner of 2000 Nobel Prize for Economics, Henry Schultz Distinguished Service Professor of Economics at the University of Chicago and director of the Center for the Economics of Human Development
- Huntington D. Lambert, dean of the Division of Continuing Education and University Extension at Harvard University
- Liang Shih-chiu, academic single-handedly responsible for translating the works of William Shakespeare into Chinese
- Margaret A. Liu, professor of Microbiology and Immunology at the University of California, San Francisco
- Reginald McKnight, Hamilton Holmes Professor of English at the University of Georgia
- Marcia McNutt, Griswold Professor of Geophysics at MIT
- Ted Morton, professor of Political Science at the University of Calgary
- John Novembre, winner of 2015 MacArthur Fellowship, professor of Computational Biology at the University of Chicago
- David Tab Rasmussen, professor of Anthropology at Washington University in St. Louis
- Kenneth Sims, professor of Isotope Geology at the University of Wyoming
- Andrew Spielman, professor of Tropical Public Health at the Harvard School of Public Health
- Pauline Turner Strong, director of the Humanities Institute at the University of Texas at Austin
- Terry Winograd, professor of Computer Science at Stanford University and co-director of the Stanford Human-Computer Interaction Group
- William Gould Young, professor of Chemistry and dean of Physical Sciences at UCLA

=== Science ===
- Sarah Andrews, geologist and author
- Brian J. Enquist, biologist and ecologist
- Richard Green, chairman of the Space Sciences Institute, previously served as president and CEO of CableLabs
- Myra Keen, malacologist and invertebrate paleontologist
- Frank Leverett, geologist who specialised in glaciology
- Margaret A. Liu, founder and leader in DNA vaccination, named one of the 50 most important women in science by Discover magazine
- Jane Lubchenco, marine ecologist and environmental scientist, former NOAA administrator
- Marcia McNutt, ForMemRS, geophysicist, 22nd president of the National Academy of Sciences of the United States (NAS), former editor-in-chief of Science, 15th director of the United States Geological Survey (USGS) (and first woman to hold the post), science adviser to the United States Secretary of the Interior
- Kenneth N. Ogle, scientist of human vision
- Andrew Spielman, public health entomologist
- G. Harry Stine, founding figure of model rocketry, science and technology writer
- William A. Welch, engineer and environmentalist

=== Military ===
- Austin R. Brunelli, brigadier general in the Marine Corps, World War II Navy Cross recipient
- Marcellus H. Chiles, World War I Medal of Honor recipient
- Hildreth Frost, captain in Colorado National Guard, lawyer during Colorado Coalfield War trials
- Bert Stiles, World War II fighter pilot awarded the Distinguished Flying Cross and the Air Medal
- Robert M. Stillman, major general in the United States Air Force

=== Athletics ===
==== Olympics ====
As of the 2018 Winter Olympics, 21 Colorado College students have competed in the Olympic Games, claiming a total of seven medals (three golds, two silvers, and two bronzes).

- Isabel Atkin, 2018 Olympic bronze medalist in women's slopestyle
- Trevor Barron, race walker who competed at the 2012 Summer Olympics
- Scott Driggers, handballer, 1988 Summer Olympics
- Alison Dunlap, professional cyclist, former Olympian
- Peggy Fleming, 1968 Olympic gold medalist in figure skating, three-time world champion figure skater (1966–1968)
- Martina Franko, Canadian Women's Soccer Team, 2008 Summer Olympics
- Christine Haigler, U.S. figure skater 1964 Winter Olympics
- David Jenkins, 1960 Olympic gold medalist in men's figure skating, three-time world champion (1957–1959)
- Hayes Alan Jenkins, gold medalist in men's figure skating, 1956 Winter Olympics, four-time world champion figure skater (1953–1956)
- Tara Nott, gold medalist in women's weight lifting, 2000 Olympics
- Eliza Outtrim, U.S. Freestyle Skiing team, 2014 Winter Olympics
- Hillary Wolf, U.S. Judo Team, 1996 Summer Olympics and 2000 Summer Olympics

==== Football ====
- Dutch Clark, Pro Football Hall of Fame player and coach
- John Gagliardi, former football coach, College Football Hall of Fame inductee
- Douglas Mitchell, Canadian Football League player and commissioner
- Ed Smith, former defensive end for the Denver Broncos
- Wayne Lucier, former professional football center and guard for the New York Giants

==== Hockey ====
Over 170 Colorado College alumni have gone on to play professionally, including over 30 current and former NHL players. In addition, nine Colorado College alumni have represented their country in hockey at the Olympics.

- Ryan Bach, NHL goaltender
- Richard Bachman, NHL player
- Art Berglund, ice hockey coach and executive, Lester Patrick Trophy award winner
- Rick Boh
- Colin Chisholm
- Brian Connelly, American Hockey League defenseman
- Joey Crabb, NHL winger, Florida Panthers
- Dave Feamster
- Bill Hay, former Chicago Blackhawks centre
- Jack Hillen, NHL ice hockey defenceman, Nashville Predators
- Doug Lidster, NHL defenceman, member of Team Canada at the 1984 Winter Olympics
- Curtis McElhinney
- Doug Palazzari, United States Hockey Hall of Fame inductee
- Toby Petersen, right winger, Dallas Stars
- Tom Preissing, NHL player, Hobey Baker Award finalist
- Nate Prosser
- Jaden Schwartz, NHL St. Louis Blues forward, Captain Team Canada World Junior 2012
- Peter Sejna, NHL ice hockey center, 2003 Men's World Ice Hockey Championships bronze medalist, Hobey Baker Award winner
- Marty Sertich, AHL ice hockey center, Hobey Baker Award winner
- Brett Sterling, NHL ice hockey player
- Colin Stuart
- Mark Stuart
- Mike Stuart, alternate captain, Winnipeg Jets
- Brian Swanson
- Lee Sweatt

==== Other ====
- Carol Rymer Davis, 2004 Gordon Bennet Cup winner
- Anton Krupicka, ultra-runner, two-time Leadville 100 winner
- Hilaree Nelson, ski mountaineer, first woman to summit two 8,000-meter peaks in a 24-hour period
- Renan Öztürk, rock climber and mountaineer
- Abbie Richards, TikToker
- Bert Stiles, pilot and author
- Jerry Wainwright, former Director of Basketball Operations for the Marquette Golden Eagles
- Al Walker (born 1959), former basketball player and college coach, now a scout for the Detroit Pistons of the NBA
- Lukas Walton, heir to the Walton family and grandson of Walmart founder Sam Walton

== Presidents of Colorado College ==
Colorado College has had numerous presidents and acting presidents since its founding:

- Rev. Jonathan Edward, 1874–1875
- Rev. James G. Dougherty, 1875–1876
- Edward P. Tenney, 1876–1884
- William F. Slocum, Jr., 1888–1917
- Clyde A. Duniway, 1917–1924
- Charles Christopher Mierow – 1923–24 (acting) and 1925–1934
- Charles Brown Hershey, 1933–1934 (acting) and 1943–1945 (acting)
- Thurston J. Davies, 1934–1948
- William H. Gill, 1949–1955
- Louis T. Benezet, 1955–1963
- Lloyd E. Worner, 1963–1981
- Thomas Cronin, 1991 (acting)
- Gresham Riley, 1981–1992
- Michael Grace, 1992–1993 (acting)
- Kathryn Mohrman, 1993–2002
- Richard F. Celeste, 2002–2011
- Jill Tiefenthaler, 2011–2020
- Mike Edmonds and Robert Moore 2020–2021 (acting)
- L. Song Richardson 2021–2024
- Manya Whitaker, 2024–2025 (acting), 2025–present

== Professors ==
- James Phinney Baxter III, historian who won the 1947 Pulitzer Prize for History for his book Scientists Against Time
- Ofer Ben-Amots, Israeli-American classical composer
- Florian Cajori, Swiss-American historian of mathematics
- Thomas Cronin, political scientist and author
- Edward Diller, German literary scholar and author
- Idris Goodwin, playwright, hip hop artist, educator, and co-creator/co-host of serial radio broadcasts
- J. Glenn Gray, philosopher, author and translator
- Steven Hayward, Canadian author and co-creator/co-host of serial radio broadcasts
- Anne F. Hyde, historian, author, 2012 Bancroft Prize winner, 2012 Pulitzer Prize finalist
- Dan Johnson, microeconomist and entrepreneur
- David Mason, poet
- Jim Parco, author, businessman, and retired Air Force lieutenant colonel
- Andrew Price-Smith, political scientist, author on health security, environmental security, pandemic influenza
- Stephen Scott, neo-classical composer
- Dennis Showalter, military historian
- Christine Siddoway, geologist, Antarctica researcher

== See also ==
- List of colleges and universities in Colorado
- Bibliography of Colorado
- Geography of Colorado
- History of Colorado
- Index of Colorado-related articles
- List of Colorado-related lists
- Outline of Colorado
