= List of California State University, Los Angeles people =

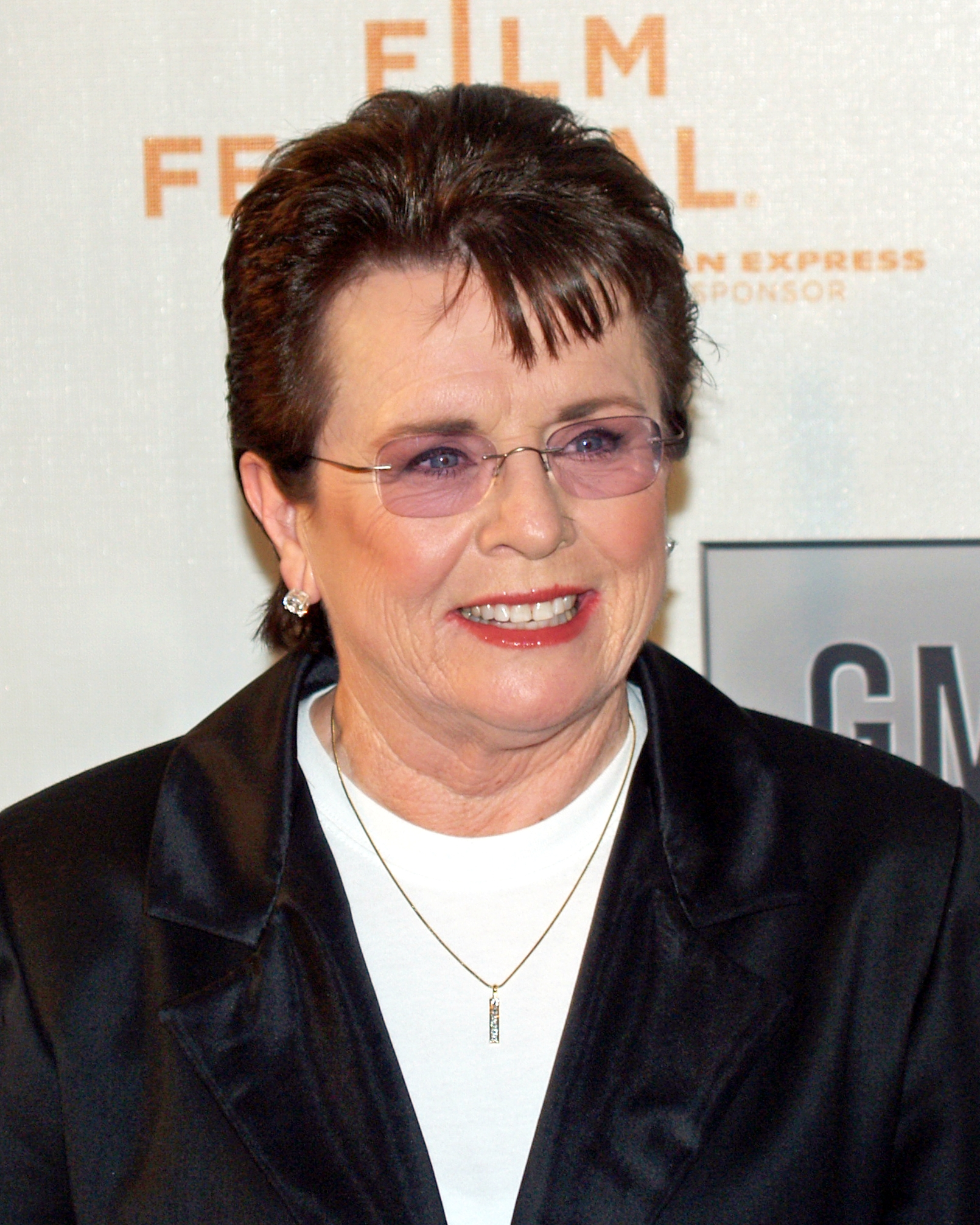
Billie Jean King, professional tennis player inducted into the International Tennis Hall of Fame in 1987

This page lists notable alumni and former students, faculty, and administrators of the California State University, Los Angeles.

== Alumni ==
=== Academia ===
Alumni of California State University, Los Angeles

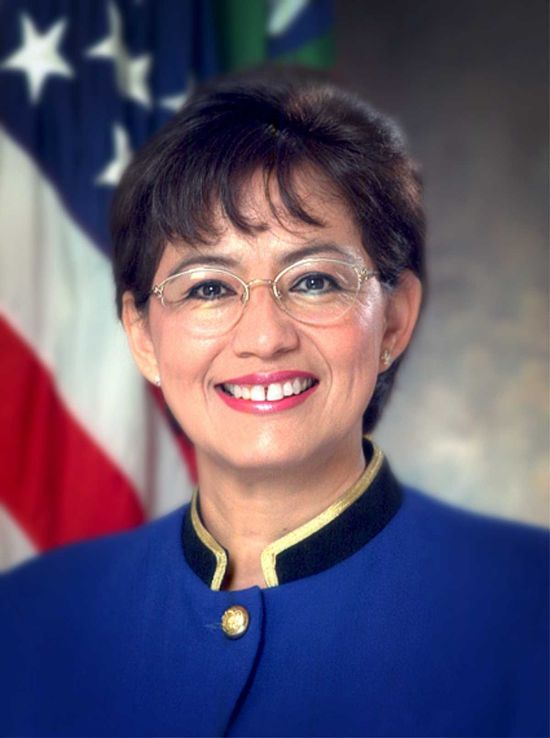
Rosario Marin, 41st U.S. treasurer

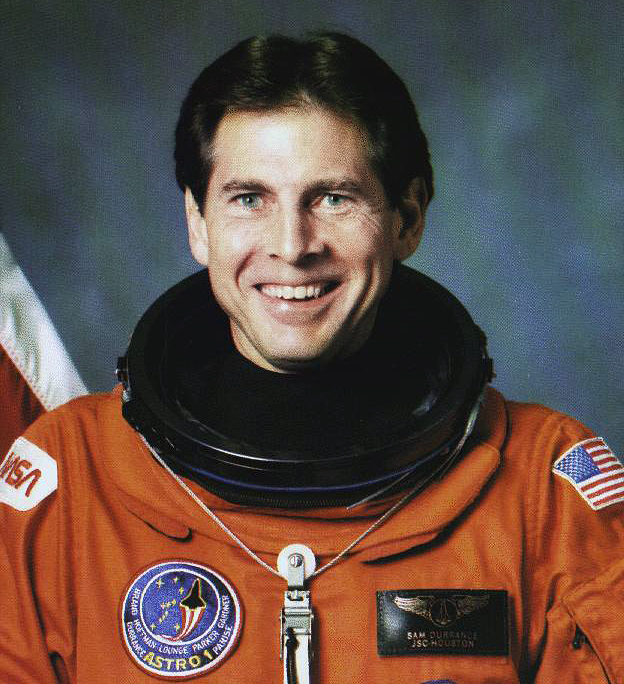
Samuel Durrance, scientist who flew aboard two NASA Space Shuttle missions as a payload specialist

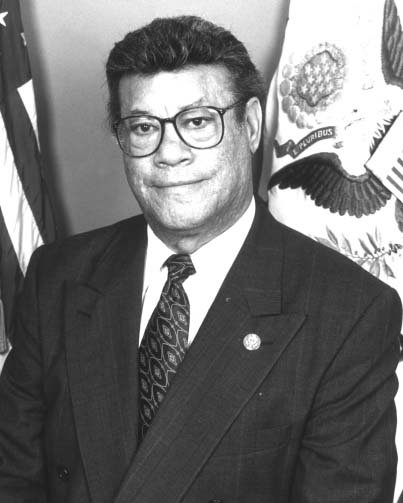
Esteban Edward Torres, appointed United States Ambassador to the United Nations Educational, Scientific and Cultural Organization (UNESCO), and served as a special assistant to President Jimmy Carter

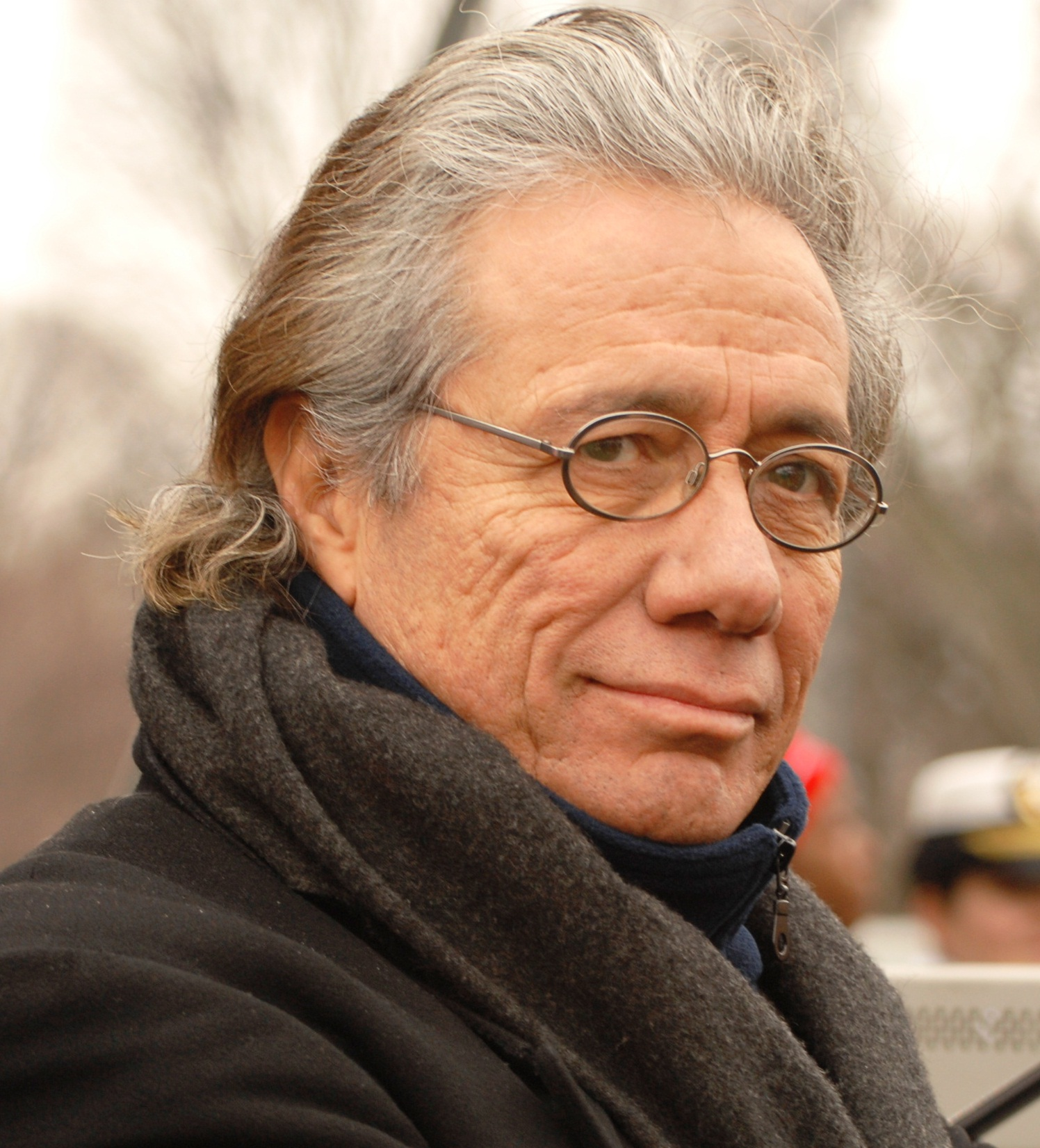
Edward James Olmos, actor and director, longtime pioneer for more diversified roles and images of Hispanics in the U.S. media

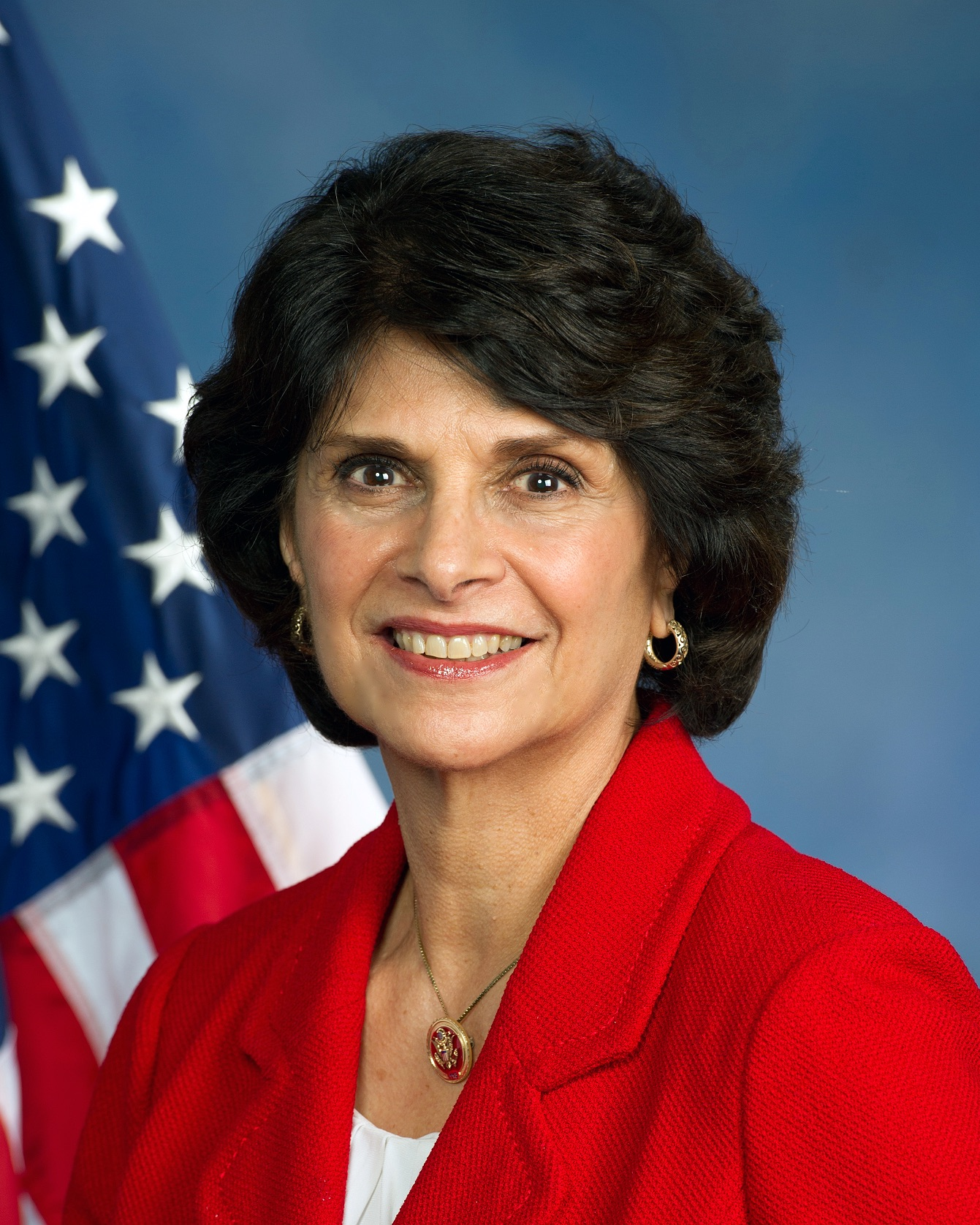
Lucille Roybal Allard, first Latina from Democratic Party to serve in the United States House of Representatives

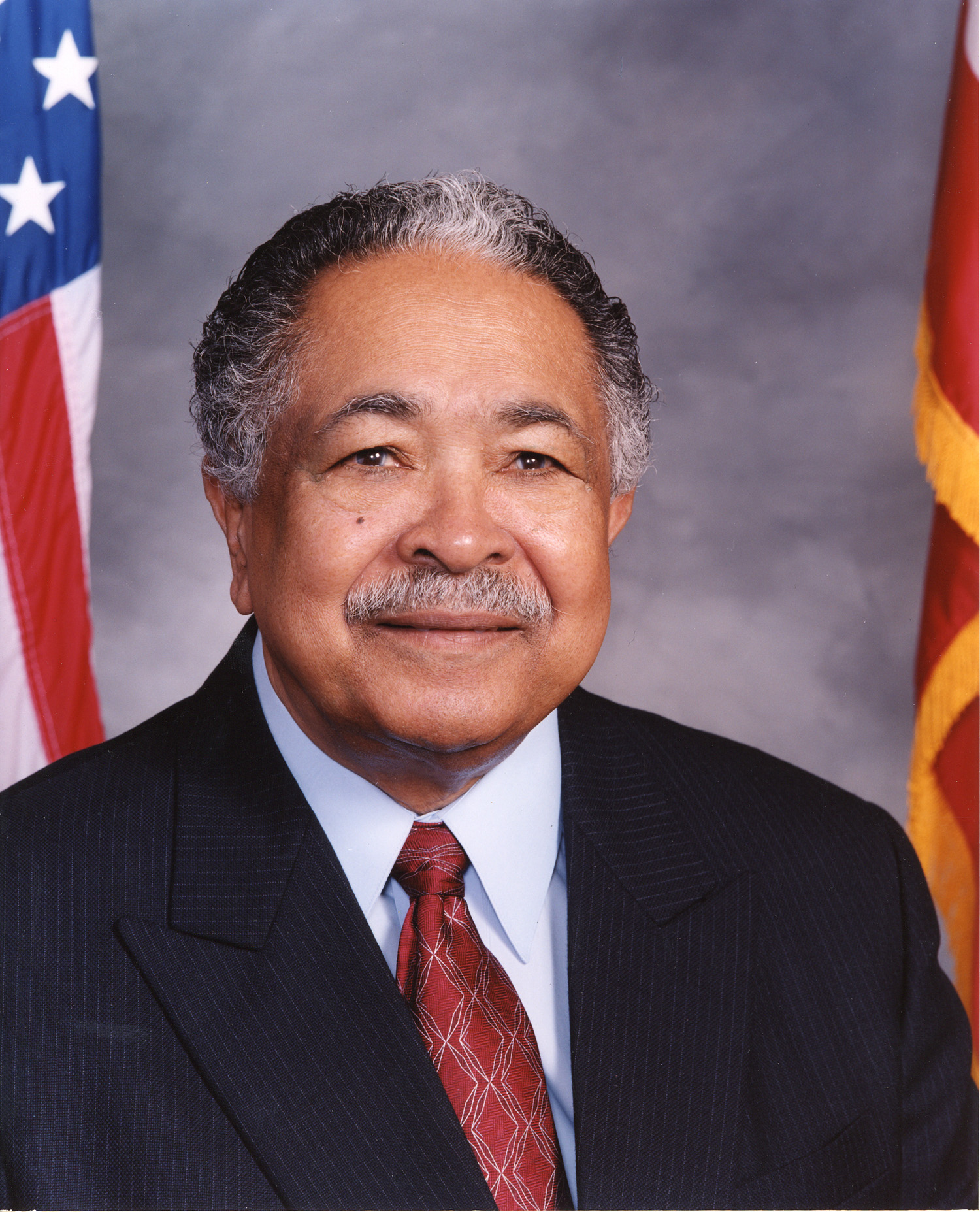
Mervyn Dymally, former lieutenant governor of California

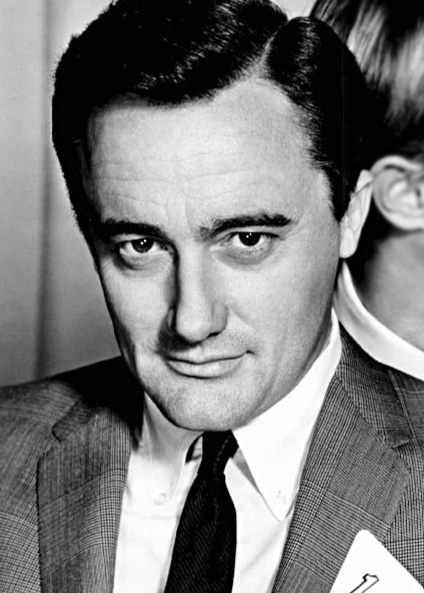
Robert Vaughn

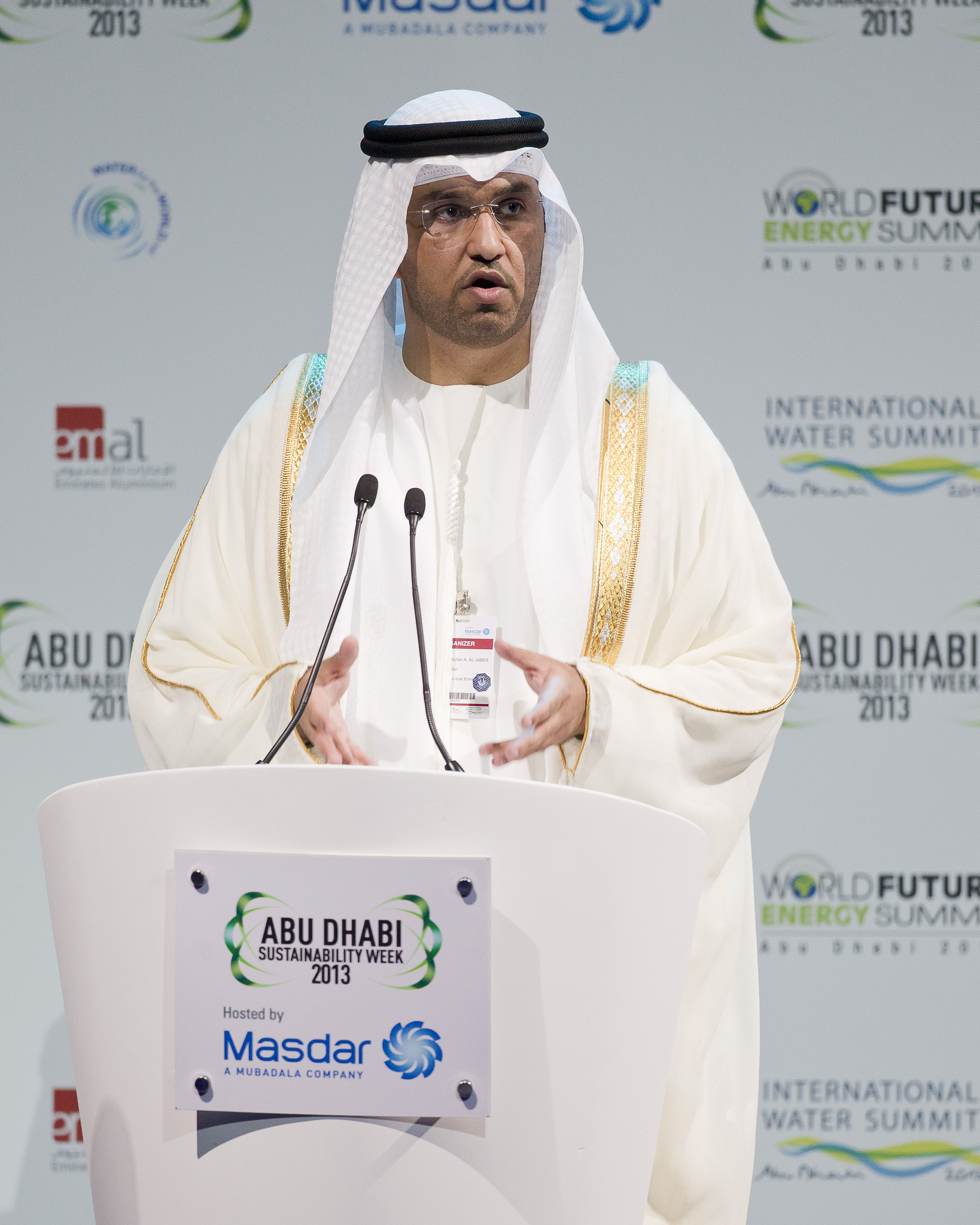
Sultan Ahmed Al Jaber, Abu Dhabi National Oil Company CEO; cabinet member and minister of state of the United Arab Emirates

- Sal Castro – educator and activist
- Edward Diller – professor of Germanic Languages and Literature, University of Oregon
- Jaime Escalante – mathematician and teacher; the subject of the 1988 Academy Award-nominated film Stand and Deliver
- Michael S. Harper – first poet laureate of Rhode Island; professor at Brown University
- Walter E. Williams – author, economist, and professor at George Mason University
- Earl G. Yarbrough – president of Savannah State University
- Lixia Zhang – professor of Computer Science at University of California, Los Angeles; co-founder of the Internet Engineering Task Force; named among 54 notable women in technology by Business Insider

=== Business ===
- Sultan Ahmed Al Jaber (MBA) – Abu Dhabi National Oil Company CEO; cabinet member and minister of state of the United Arab Emirates
- James A. Bell ('97) – CFO of the Boeing Company
- Donald Sterling (BA) – former owner of the Los Angeles Clippers

=== Entertainment ===
- Dustin Lee Abraham – producer and screenwriter
- Al Anthony – LA area radio personality
- Alan Arkin ('52) – actor, received the Academy Award for Best Supporting Actor in Little Miss Sunshine (2006)
- Gabe Baltazar – jazz and studio musician
- Billy Barty ('49, '75) – actor, activist for Little People rights; appeared in the Ron Howard film Willow
- Luis Bonilla – composer, musician
- Kara Brock ('98) – television and film actress (The Parkers)
- Jack Cooper – composer, arranger, musician
- Eric "Bobo" Correa – musician, rap and pop artist
- Sam Elliott – actor
- Phil Feather – studio musician, multireedist
- Barry Gordon ('86) – former president of the Screen Actors Guild, adjunct professor of political science at Cal State LA
- Suzanna Guzmán – mezzo soprano, an original associate artist of Los Angeles Opera
- Telma Hopkins – actress
- Danny House – jazz and studio musician
- Daniel Knauf ('82) – screenwriter, producer and director
- Ronnie Lang – jazz and studio musician
- Isaac Larian – chief executive officer of MGA Entertainment
- Steven Lee – music producer, composer, instrumentalist
- Ricardo Lemvo – Congo-born Angolan bandleader, singer of Makina Loca
- Tiny Lister – actor, former pro wrestler
- Lennie Niehaus – composer, arranger, musician
- Edward James Olmos – actor, director
- Alfonso Ribeiro – actor, television host
- Gil Robertson IV – author, journalist and president of the African American Film Critics Association
- Scott Shaw – author, actor, filmmaker, and martial artist
- Robin Shou – martial artist and actor
- Phil Snyder (MFA 2012) – voice actor, voice of Disney's Jiminy Cricket in Kingdom Hearts and Disney Home Video, professor at the University of Houston
- Cheryl Tiegs – model and actress
- Robert Vaughn (BA 1956, MA 1964) – actor

=== Literature ===
- Octavia Butler – science fiction author
- Nahshon Dion – creative nonfiction writer
- Leon Leyson (born Leib Lejzon) – author of The Boy on the Wooden Box, Holocaust survivor saved by Oskar Schindler
- Marilyn Reynolds – young adult fiction author
- Joseph Wambaugh ('60) – bestselling novelist

=== Politics ===
- Richard Alatorre – member of the California State Assembly and the Los Angeles City Council
- Michael D. Antonovich – politician, member of the Los Angeles County Board of Supervisors (Fifth District)
- Joe Baca – member of United States House of Representatives and former chairman of the Congressional Hispanic Caucus
- Lee Baca ('71) – former sheriff of Los Angeles County
- Sukhbir Singh Badal – deputy chief minister of Punjab, India
- John J. Benoit – California State Senate
- Wendy Carrillo – politician serving in the California State Assembly
- Stephen Cooley ('71) – district attorney, Los Angeles County
- Julian C. Dixon – former member of the California State Assembly, former member of Congress
- Mervyn Dymally – first foreign-born black congressman, first black lt. governor of California, member of the California State Assembly
- Evan Freed – attorney, photographer of Robert F. Kennedy
- Elton Gallegly – former member of United States House of Representatives
- Steve Hofbauer – mayor of Palmdale, California
- Tom LaBonge – Los Angeles City Council
- Rosario Marin ('83) – 41st U.S. treasurer
- Juanita Millender-McDonald – member of United States House of Representatives
- Gloria Molina – former member of the Los Angeles County Board of Supervisors and the Los Angeles County Metropolitan Transportation Authority
- Sasha Renée Pérez – California state senator and former mayor of Alhambra
- Lucille Roybal-Allard – member of United States House of Representatives; former chair of the Congressional Hispanic Caucus
- Kelly Seyarto – member of the California State Assembly; former mayor of Murrieta, California
- Esteban Edward Torres – US representative for California's 34th congressional district 1983-1999
- Robert A. Underwood – delegate of Guam to the United States House of Representatives
- Maxine Waters – member of United States House of Representatives
- Diane Watson ('67) – member of the United States House of Representatives and ambassador to Micronesia

=== Religion ===
- J. Jon Bruno – bishop of the Episcopal Diocese of Los Angeles, 2002–

=== Science ===
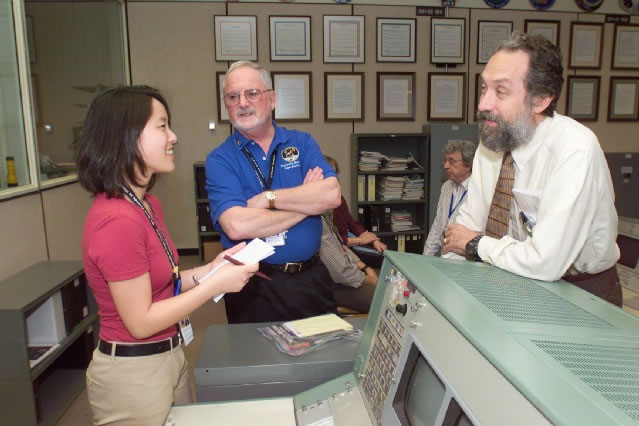
Sy Liebergot

- Samuel Durrance (BS 1972, MS 1974) – NASA astronaut (Columbia and Endeavour), astrophysicist, educator
- Sy Liebergot – NASA flight controller during Project Apollo, author, space historian

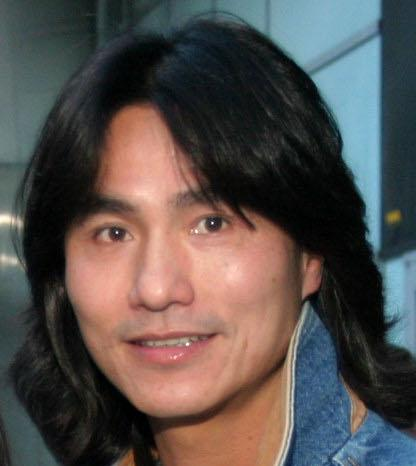
Robin Shou

=== Sports ===
- John Adams – former NFL player
- LaVar Ball – former basketball and football player, founder, owner, and CEO of Big Baller Brand; father of Lonzo, LiAngelo, and LaMelo Ball
- Mike Burns – professional Major League Baseball pitcher for the Boston Red Sox
- Don Davis – former NFL player
- Joe Faust – Olympian high jumper, mathematics teacher, aviation publisher, renewal energy researcher (kite energy systems)
- Jay Gibbons – professional Major League Baseball former outfielder for the Los Angeles Dodgers and the Baltimore Orioles
- Mitch Johnson – former NFL player
- Walter Johnson – former National Football League player with the Cleveland Browns
- Howard Kindig – former NFL player
- Billie Jean King (BA '26) – professional tennis player, inducted into the International Tennis Hall of Fame in 1987
- Martin Vasquez – head coach of C.D. Chivas USA, in Major League Soccer; first player to be on both the United States and Mexico's national teams
- Mal Whitfield – gold medalist, 1948 London Olympics and 1952 Helsinki Olympics
- Frank Zane – professional bodybuilder and teacher

=== Visual arts ===
- Flávio Cabral, muralist
- Jaklin Romine – artist
- Raul Ruiz – journalist, photographed the police aiming tear gas launchers at the Silver Dollar Café, where Ruben Salazar was killed
- Hisako Terasaki – artist
- Kent Twitchell ('72) – muralist
- Lisa Diane Wedgeworth – visual artist

== Faculty ==
The University Hymn
All hail to thee, our alma mater dear! We sing with faith and pride thy praises far and near. We dedicate our lives to truth and peace and right, To give the world the torch of freedom's light. Hail, All Hail!

— Marian Crowell Bessette (’49)
- Melina Abdullah – chair of the Pan-African Studies Department
- Daniel Amneus – emeritus professor of English, specializing in Shakespearean textual criticism
- Jerry Farber – civil rights activist and former child actor
- Hal Fishman – assistant adjunct professor of political science; won the Associated Press Television-Radio Association's first-ever Lifetime Achievement Award for his work as a Los Angeles local (KTLA) news anchor
- Ann Garry – professor emerita of Philosophy; early pioneer of the field of feminist philosophy
- William M. London – professor of public health and consumer advocate
- Antony C. Sutton – economist, historian, professor, and writer
- Wirt Williams – novelist, journalist, and professor of English

=== Distinguished visiting adjunct professors ===
- Christopher Isherwood – taught Modern English Literature 1961–1962; author; his Berlin Stories was the basis for the Broadway musical and film, Cabaret
- Dorothy Parker – taught in the English department 1962–63; writer; founding member of the Algonquin Round Table; inducted into the American Academy of Arts and Letters in 1959
- Glenn Wilson – visiting professor, summer quarters 1971-72, 1974-75; pioneer of evolutionary psychology; introduced 2D:4D digit ratio as a marker of prenatal testosterone

=== Trustee professors ===
- Barry Munitz – 5th chancellor of the California State University system, and 6th president of the University of Houston
