= Tiefenthaler =

Tiefenthaler is a German-language toponymic surname for someone originating from Tiefenthal. Notable people with the surname include:

- Dominik Tiefenthaler (born 1971), Austrian-German actor
- Gustav Tiefenthaler (1886–1942), Swiss-American wrestler
- Jill Tiefenthaler (born 1965), American professor of economics and president of Colorado College
- Joseph Tiefenthaler (1710–1785), Austrian Jesuit missionary and geographer
- Paulo Tiefenthaler (born 1968), Swiss-Brazilian actor
- Verle Tiefenthaler (1937–2025), American Major League Baseball pitcher
