= Greene County Courthouse =

Greene County Courthouse may refer to:

- Old Greene County Courthouse, Eutaw, Alabama
- Greene County Courthouse (Arkansas), Paragould, Arkansas
- Greene County Courthouse (Georgia), Greensboro, Georgia
- Greene County Courthouse (Illinois), Carrollton, Illinois
- Greene County Courthouse (Indiana), Bloomfield, Indiana
- Greene County Courthouse (Iowa), Jefferson, Iowa
- Greene County Courthouse (Missouri), Springfield, Missouri
- Greene County Courthouse (Mississippi), Leakesville, Mississippi, a Mississippi Landmark
- Greene County Courthouse (North Carolina), Snow Hill, North Carolina
- Greene County Courthouse (Ohio), Xenia, Ohio
- Greene County Courthouse (Virginia), Stanardsville, Virginia

== See also ==
- Green County Courthouse (disambiguation)
