= Green County Courthouse =

Green County Courthouse may refer to:

- Old Courthouse (Greensburg, Kentucky), listed on the National Register of Historic Places.
- Green County Courthouse (Wisconsin), Monroe, Wisconsin

== See also ==
- Greene County Courthouse (disambiguation)
- Tom Green County Courthouse, San Angelo, Texas
