= University of California, Irvine School of Law =

American law school

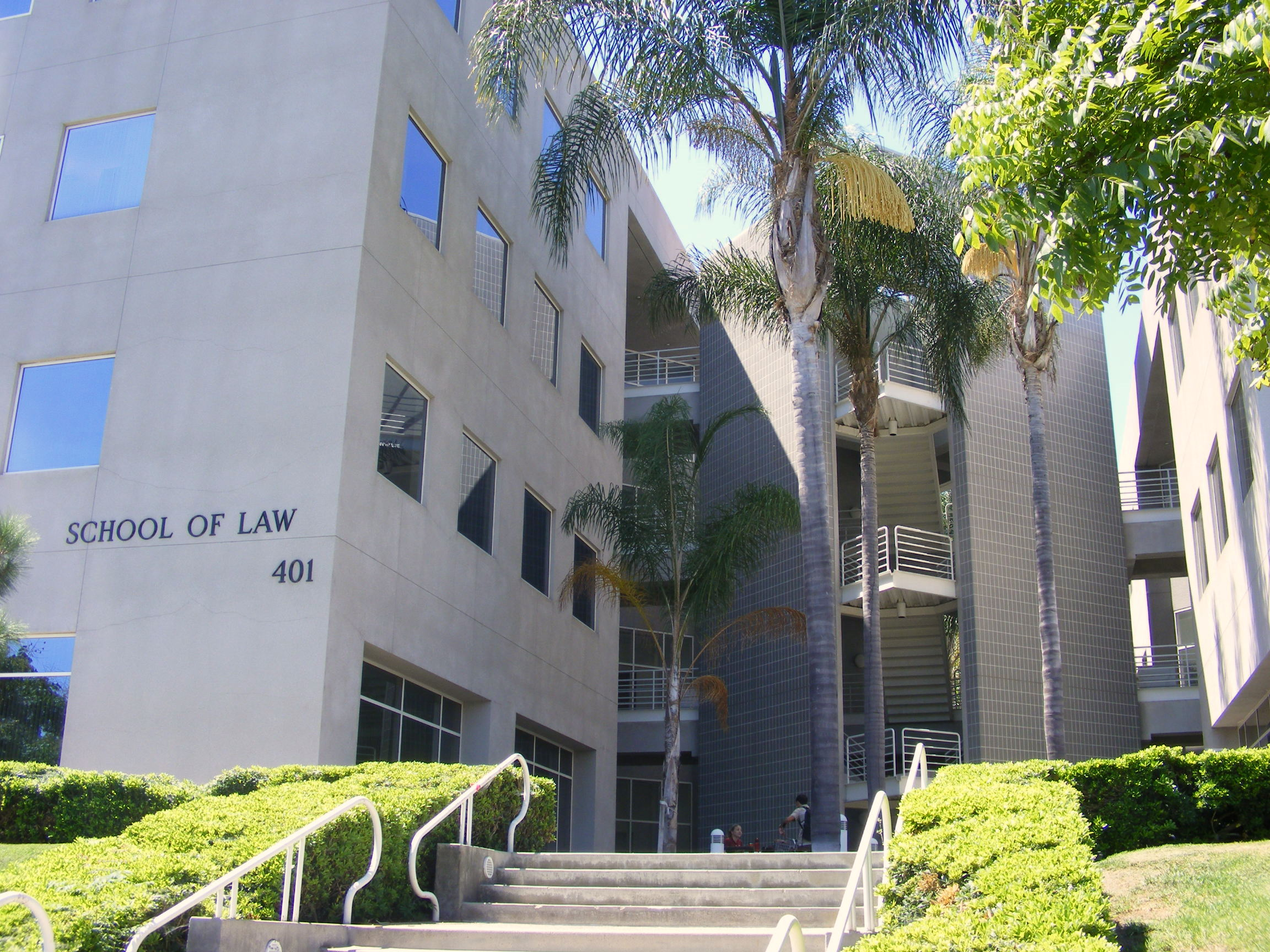
- UCI School of Law building
- Parent school: University of California, Irvine
- Established: 2007; 19 years ago
- School type: Public
- Parent endowment: $1.3 billion
- Dean: Austen Parrish
- Location: Irvine, California, United States
- Enrollment: 467
- Faculty: 145
- USNWR ranking: 34th (tie) (2026)
- Bar pass rate: 90% (July 2025 1st time takers)
- Website: law.uci.edu
- ABA profile: Standard 509 Report

The University of California, Irvine School of Law (also known as UC Irvine Law) is the law school at the University of California, Irvine. Founded in 2007, it is the fifth and newest law school in the University of California system. Its foundation ended an over 40-year hiatus in the creation of public law schools in California.

Erwin Chemerinsky served as the dean of UC Irvine Law from September 2007 to 2017, until being hired as dean of the UC Berkeley School of Law. L. Song Richardson became the interim dean in July 2017 and the dean in January 2018. Song Richardson served as the dean until 2021, leaving to become president of Colorado College. Bryant Garth became interim dean in July 2021. Austen Parrish was named as the school's third dean in April 2022.

== History ==
Classes officially began on August 24, 2009. Approximately four percent of applicants were accepted to join the inaugural class of 60 students, with 34 being women and 26 men.

The school became eligible for, and was granted, provisional accreditation by the American Bar Association in 2011. It was granted full accreditation in June 2014.

== Admissions ==
Students enrolling in Fall 2026 had a median GPA of 3.87 and a median LSAT of 170, with fewer than 13% of applicants admitted.

== Tuition ==
For the first, second and third entering classes, tuition was paid for by private scholarships from Mark P. Robinson Jr. and others, at 100%, 50% and 33%, respectively.

The tuition for the 2011-2012 academic year was approximately $40,000 for California residents and $52,000 for non-residents and the total cost of tuition (not including the cost of living) at the University of California-Irvine School of Law for the 2025–2026 academic year was $61,208 for California residents and $73,453 for non-residents. The estimated cost of living on campus is $25,786 per year.

== Scholarships ==
The school raised funds for full scholarships for all members of its inaugural class.

The school announced that universal scholarships would not be offered for the Class of 2015, while need-based financial aid would still be available. The school funded 20 full scholarships, including ones specifically for students wishing to pursue public interest law.

During the 2019–2020 academic year, 39.1% of students received a scholarship covering more than 50% of the tuition cost, 55.1% of students received a scholarship covering less than 50% of the tuition cost, and 2.1% of students received no scholarship.

== Rankings ==
UCI Law School was ranked #30 in the nation by U.S. News & World Report in March 2015. The publication ranked UC Irvine 11th for its clinical program, 23rd for its intellectual property law program, and in the top ten for the student diversity index. For 2026, U.S. News & World Report ranked UCI Law School 34th nationally.

== Federal clerkships ==
In December 2011, the percentage of the Class of 2012 students who had received Federal District Court or Circuit Court judge clerkships for the year following graduation was second to the highest-ranking Yale and ahead of Harvard Law.

In May 2015, the ABA law school employment data ranked UCI third in the placement of federal clerkships, behind only Yale and Stanford. In 2023, there were 15 federal clerkships. Between 2020 and 2024, UCI reported on average 12 federal clerkships per year.

== Employment ==
According to UC Irvine's official 2015 ABA-required disclosures, 93% of the Class of 2024 obtained full-time, long-term, JD-required employment nine months after graduation. UC Irvine's Law School Transparency under-employment score was 6%, indicating the percentage of the Class of 2024 unemployed, pursuing an additional degree, or working in a non-professional, short-term, or part-time job nine months after graduation. As of January 2025, 97% of the 2023 graduating class was employed, with a 97% bar passage rate.
