= Shawnee Field =

- IATA: none; ICAO: none; FAA LID: 1I3

Summary
- Airport type: Public
- Owner: Shawnee Field Inc.
- Serves: Bloomfield, Indiana
- Elevation AMSL: 501 ft / 153 m
- Coordinates: 39°02′40.163″N 087°00′20.03″W
- Interactive map of Shawnee Field

Runways
Direction	Length		Surface
Direction	ft	m	Surface
18/36	2,160	658	Turf

Statistics (2007)
- Aircraft operations: 8,283
- Based aircraft: 21
- Source: Federal Aviation Administration

Shawnee Field is a public use airport in Greene County, Indiana, United States. It is owned by Shawnee Field Inc. and is located three nautical miles (5.56 km) west of the central business district of Bloomfield, Indiana.

Although most U.S. airports use the same three-letter location identifier for the FAA and IATA, this airport is assigned 1I3 by the FAA but has no designation from the IATA.

== Facilities and aircraft ==
Shawnee Field covers an area of 29 acres (12 ha) at an elevation of 501 feet (153 m) above mean sea level. It has one runway designated 18/36 with a turf surface measuring 2,160 by 150 feet (658 x 46 m).

For the 12-month period ending December 31, 2007, the airport had 8,283 aircraft operations, an average of 23 per day: 100% general aviation with a few ultralights. At that time there were 21 aircraft based at this airport: 86% single-engine and 14% ultralights.

== Accidents ==
On August 25, 2009, two men were killed when their ultralight aircraft either failed to takeoff or failed to land. The craft crashed into a field.

== See also ==
- List of airports in Indiana
