= Max Kidd (American football) =

American football player and coach (1901–1975)

Biographical details
- Born: July 27, 1901; Bloomfield, Indiana, U.S.
- Died: September 1, 1975 (aged 74); Terre Haute, Indiana, U.S.

Playing career
- 1921–1923: Indiana

Coaching career (HC unless noted)
- 1927–1936: Bicknell HS (IN)
- 1937–1951: Brazil HS (IN)
- 1952–1957: Pawnee HS (IN)
- 1958–1961: Rose Polytechnic

Head coaching record
- Overall: 3–17–2 (college)

Max J. Kidd (July 27, 1901 – September 1, 1975) was an American high school and college football coach. He served as the head football coach at Rose Polytechnic Institute—now known as Rose-Hulman Institute of Technology—from 1959 to 1961, compiling a record of 3–17–2.
