= Bloomfield, Indiana =

- Town
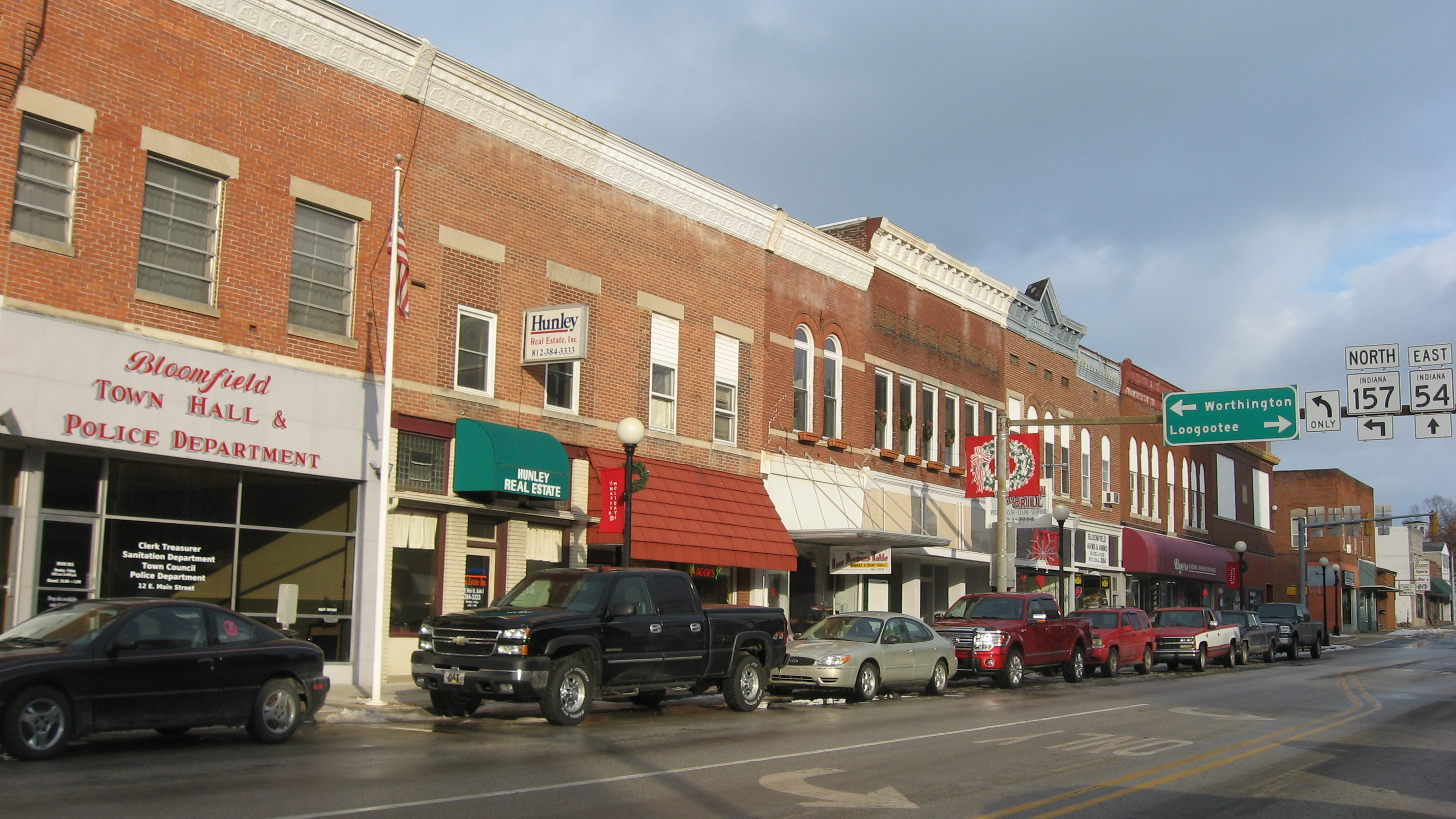
- Buildings in downtown Bloomfield

- Location of Bloomfield in Greene County, Indiana.
- Coordinates: 39°01′34″N 86°56′15″W
- Country: United States
- State: Indiana
- County: Greene
- Township: Richland
- Founded: 1824
- Incorporated: 1850

Area
  - Total: 1.41 sq mi (3.65 km^{2})
  - Land: 1.41 sq mi (3.65 km^{2})
  - Water: 0 sq mi (0.00 km^{2})
- Elevation: 600 ft (180 m)

Population (2020)
  - Total: 2,289
  - Density: 1,625.7/sq mi (627.68/km^{2})
- Time zone: UTC-5 (EST)
  - Summer (DST): UTC-4 (EST)
- ZIP code: 47424
- Area code: 812
- FIPS code: 18-05716
- GNIS ID: 2396592
- Website: www.in.gov/towns/bloomfield/

Bloomfield is a town within Richland Township and the county seat of Greene County, Indiana, United States. The population was 2,289 at the 2020 census.

Bloomfield is part of the Bloomington, Indiana metropolitan area.

== History ==
The area where Bloomfield is located has been inhabited by Native Americans since prehistory. Tribes that have lived in the area include the Miami tribe, Kickapoo, Piankeshaw and Wea. A settlement of Woodland period people has been excavated by Indiana and Ball State Universities research teams near the confluence of Richland Creek and the White River south of Bloomfield.

The town of Bloomfield was laid out in 1824 when Greene County needed a new county seat due to the lack of a reliable water source for the town of Burlington. Burlington was located west of Bloomfield near the west fork of the White River.

The Greene County Courthouse, a log building in the town's center, was the town's first building. The current Greene County Courthouse, a brick structure built in the late 19th century, stands at the same location. An expansion and renovation project was completed in 2008. It was listed on the National Register of Historic Places in 2008.

In 1824, Peter Cornelius Van Slyke donated land to Greene County for the purpose of establishing a new county seat. Van Slyke was born on the Mohawk River in Schenectady County, New York, on April 5, 1766. He migrated to southern Indiana in 1816. Van Slyke was a veteran of the War of 1812 and died on September 25, 1834.

The well-known Rousseau brothers, Lovell H. Rousseau and Richard H. Rousseau, both located in Bloomfield in 1841 to practice law. They served as Greene County State Representatives and Lovell as State Senator until returning to Kentucky in 1849. During that period, Lovell raised a company of Greene County men (Co. E, 2nd Indiana Infantry) to fight in the Mexican War, who were conspicuous at the Battle of Buena Vista (1847). Following their return to Kentucky, Lovell became nationally famous/distinguished, and the local Bloomfield Chapter of the Grand Army of the Republic was named for him (Post #326).

Bloomfield was incorporated as a town in 1850.

Bloomfield Jr./Sr. High School has also been home to Indiana Basketball Hall of Fame coaches Guy Glover (1954–1977) and Steve Brett (1978–1993).

== Geography ==
According to the 2010 census, Bloomfield has a total area of 1.38 square miles (3.57 km^{2}), all land.

== Demographics ==
Historical population
Census	Pop.	Note	%±
1850	234		—
1870	656		—
1880	988		50.6%
1890	1,229		24.4%
1900	1,588		29.2%
1910	2,069		30.3%
1920	1,872		−9.5%
1930	2,298		22.8%
1940	2,270		−1.2%
1950	2,086		−8.1%
1960	2,224		6.6%
1970	2,565		15.3%
1980	2,705		5.5%
1990	2,592		−4.2%
2000	2,542		−1.9%
2010	2,405		−5.4%
2020	2,289		−4.8%
Source: U.S. Census Bureau

=== 2020 census ===
As of the 2020 census, Bloomfield had a population of 2,289. The median age was 41.7 years. 20.4% of residents were under the age of 18 and 19.6% of residents were 65 years of age or older. For every 100 females there were 103.5 males, and for every 100 females age 18 and over there were 100.6 males age 18 and over.

0.0% of residents lived in urban areas, while 100.0% lived in rural areas.

There were 1,022 households in Bloomfield, of which 26.2% had children under the age of 18 living in them. Of all households, 37.1% were married-couple households, 24.2% were households with a male householder and no spouse or partner present, and 32.2% were households with a female householder and no spouse or partner present. About 39.5% of all households were made up of individuals and 17.3% had someone living alone who was 65 years of age or older.

There were 1,206 housing units, of which 15.3% were vacant. The homeowner vacancy rate was 2.9% and the rental vacancy rate was 16.9%.

Racial composition as of the 2020 census
Race	Number	Percent
White	2,163	94.5%
Black or African American	8	0.3%
American Indian and Alaska Native	0	0.0%
Asian	18	0.8%
Native Hawaiian and Other Pacific Islander	0	0.0%
Some other race	4	0.2%
Two or more races	96	4.2%
Hispanic or Latino (of any race)	41	1.8%

=== 2010 census ===
As of the 2010 census, there were 2,405 people, 1,109 households, and 628 families living in the town. The population density was 1,742.8 inhabitants per square mile (672.9/km^{2}). There were 1,263 housing units at an average density of 915.2 per square mile (353.4/km^{2}). The racial makeup of the town was 98.0% White, 0.5% African American, 0.6% Asian, 0.1% from other races, and 0.7% from two or more races. Hispanic or Latino of any race were 1.3% of the population.

There were 1,109 households, of which 29.7% had children under the age of 18 living with them, 40.3% were married couples living together, 12.9% had a female householder with no husband present, 3.4% had a male householder with no wife present, and 43.4% were non-families. 40.2% of all households were made up of individuals, and 18.7% had someone living alone who was 65 years of age or older. The average household size was 2.16 and the average family size was 2.89.

The median age in the town was 39.7 years. 24.5% of residents were under the age of 18; 8.3% were between the ages of 18 and 24; 24.3% were from 25 to 44; 24.5% were from 45 to 64; and 18.5% were 65 years of age or older. The gender makeup of the town was 46.9% male and 53.1% female.

=== 2000 census ===
As of the 2000 census, there were 2,542 people, 1,180 households, and 665 families living in the town. The population density was 1,841.1 inhabitants per square mile (710.9/km^{2}). There were 1,315 housing units at an average density of 952.4 per square mile (367.7/km^{2}). The racial makeup of the town was 98.31% White, 0.20% African American, 0.08% Native American, 0.43% Asian, 0.31% from other races, and 0.67% from two or more races. Hispanic or Latino of any race were 1.10% of the population.

There were 1,180 households, out of which 23.6% had children under the age of 18 living with them, 43.6% were married couples living together, 10.3% had a female householder with no husband present, and 43.6% were non-families. 40.5% of all households were made up of individuals, and 18.9% had someone living alone who was 65 years of age or older. The average household size was 2.06 and the average family size was 2.76.

In the town, the population was spread out, with 20.8% under the age of 18, 8.5% from 18 to 24, 26.2% from 25 to 44, 22.7% from 45 to 64, and 21.7% who were 65 years of age or older. The median age was 41 years. For every 100 females, there were 91.0 males. For every 100 females age 18 and over, there were 87.2 males.

The median income for a household in the town was $30,224, and the median income for a family was $42,656. Males had a median income of $31,864 versus $23,879 for females. The per capita income for the town was $18,045. About 12.0% of families and 16.6% of the population were below the poverty line, including 21.2% of those under age 18 and 11.8% of those age 65 or over.

== Education ==
- Bloomfield School District consists of grades K-12. The District includes the Bloomfield Middle and High School. All grades are contained in the same location/building.
- Bloomfield has a public library, a branch of the Bloomfield-Eastern Greene County Bloomfield Public Library.
- The Bloomfield Public Library Annex is located on the corner of Spring Street and Washington Street.

== Arts and culture ==
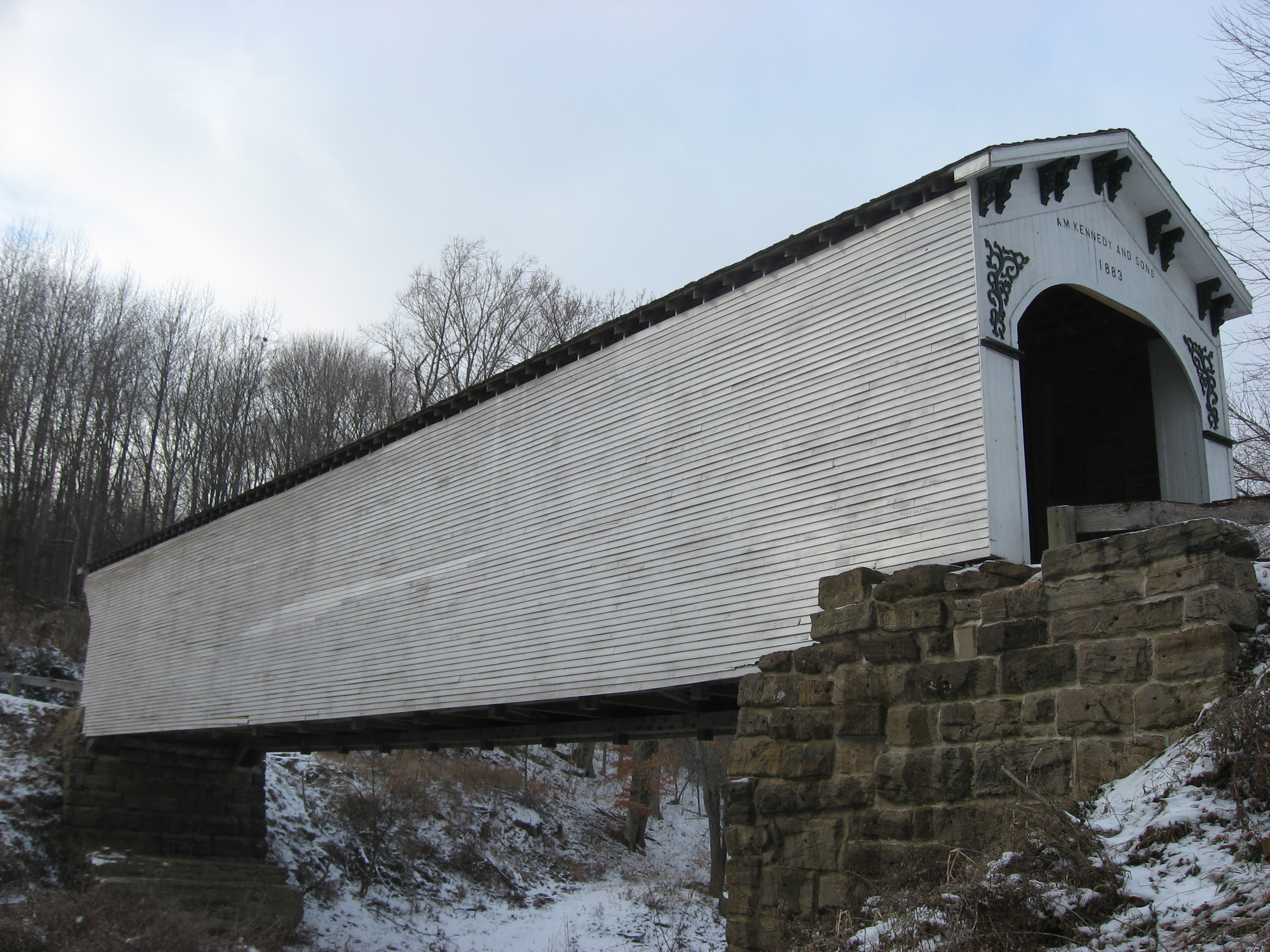
The Richland-Plummer Creek Bridge

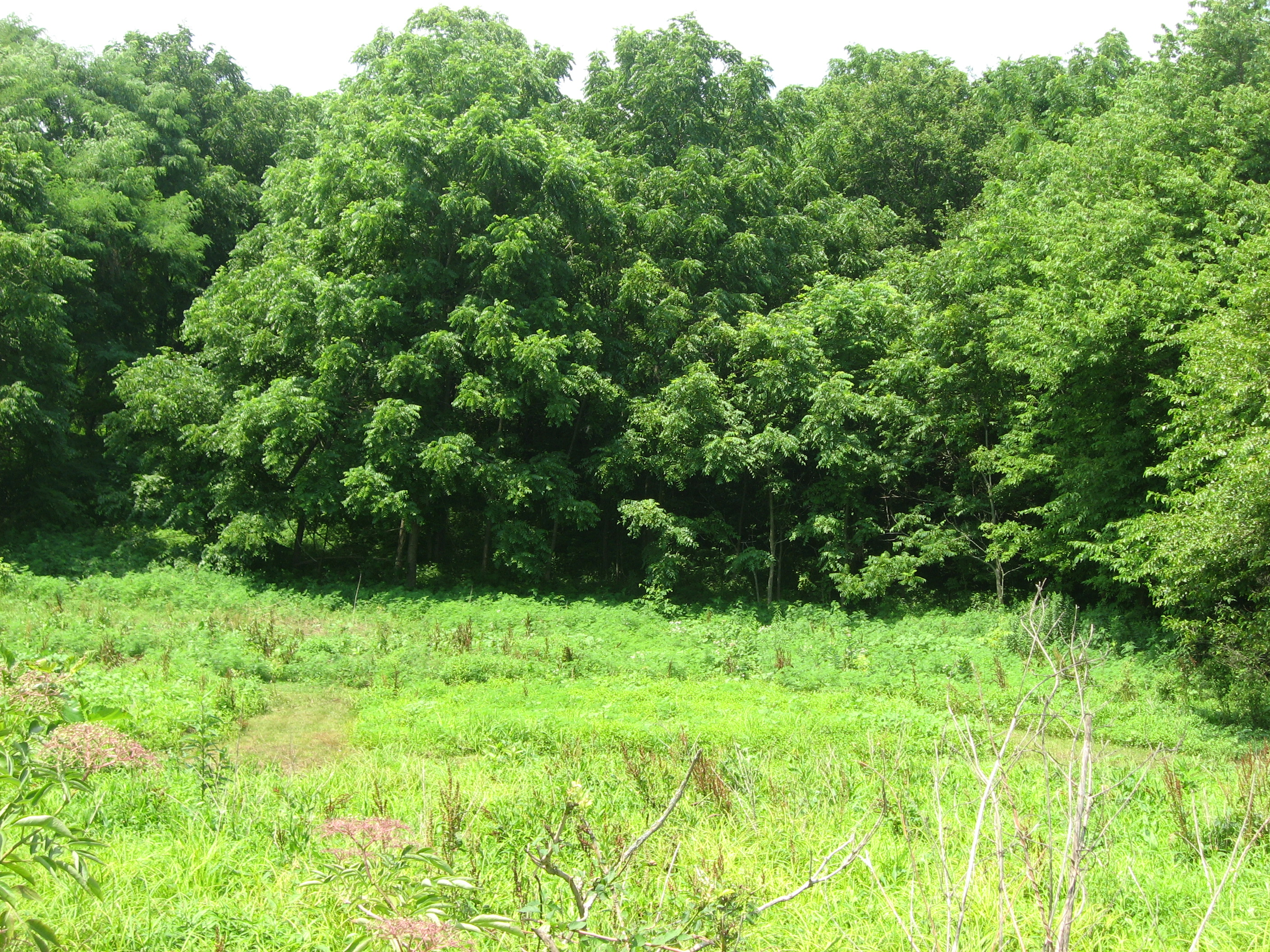
Part of the Osborn Site, an archaeological site west of Bloomfield

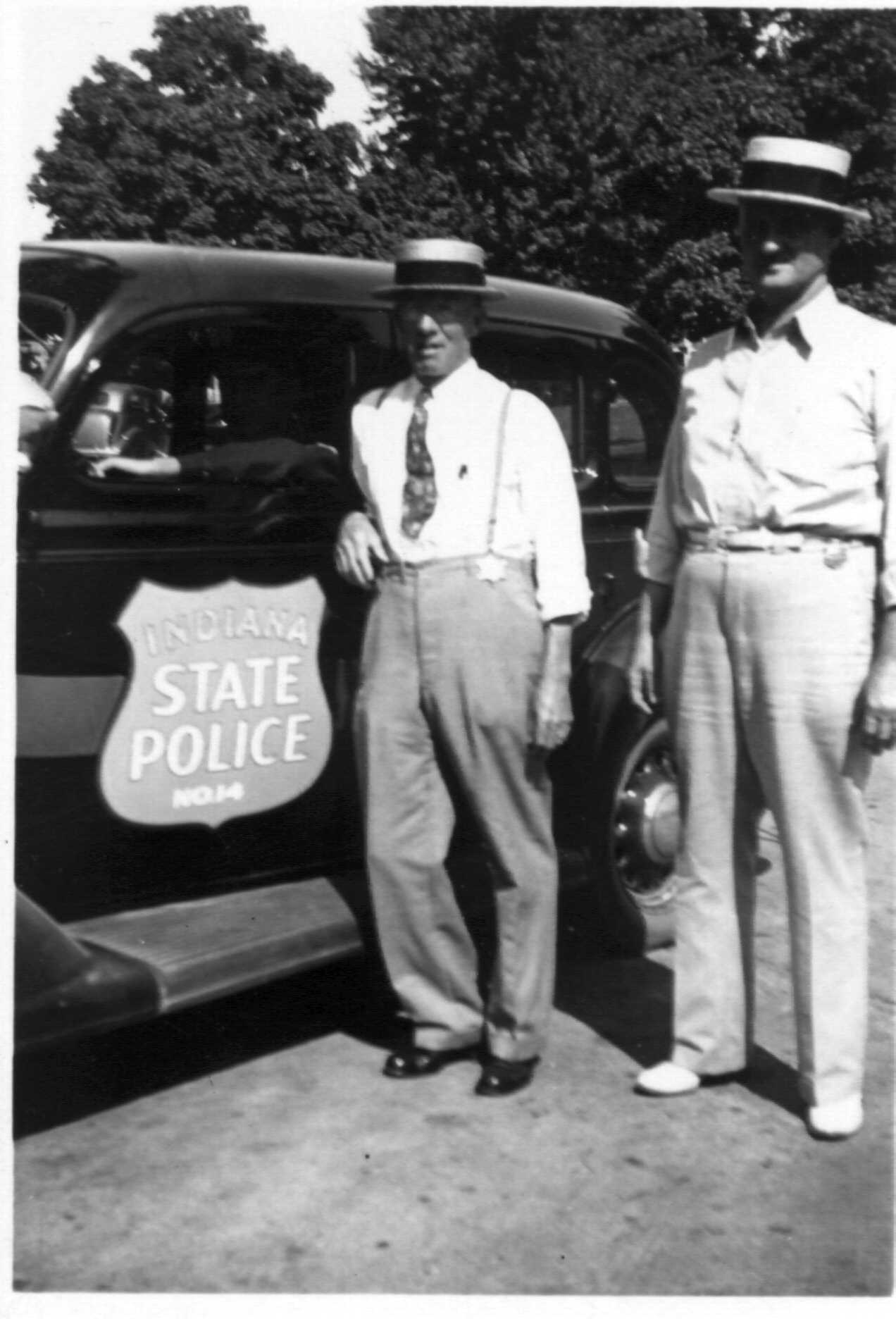
Bloomfield law enforcement officers (Deputy Sheriff Lem Clark, center) with the Indiana State Police circa 1940

- The Bloomfield Town Park is located at 61 West Main Street adjacent to the Bloomfield School. Located in the park is a Turn-of-the-Century Bandstand, 2 enclosed shelter houses, 2 open shelter houses, an array of play ground equipment, two basketball open basketball courts and one enclosed basketball courts.
- One of the best preserved covered bridges in the state is Bloomfield's Richland-Plummer Creek Covered Bridge, built by A.M. Kennedy and Sons in 1883. It is located approximately 1 3/4 miles south of town. It was listed on the National Register of Historic Places in 1993.
- The World's Largest Hi-Lift Jack is located in front of the Hi-Lift Jack Company/Bloomfield Manufacturing Company on Spring Street in Bloomfield. The replica jack, produced to commemorate the company's 100th anniversary, is made of cast iron, stands 20 feet tall, and weights 2,980 pounds.
- Near Bloomfield is the Tulip Viaduct.
- Bloomfield is the home of the Shawnee Summer Theatre Indiana's oldest continuously running professional summer theater. Shawnee has operated, uninterrupted, since 1960.
- The man who owned the land where Bloomfield was built (Peter Cornelius Van Slyke) is buried in Bloomfield in the Van Slyke cemetery on the west end of town (behind the old woolen mill).
- A sign near the Van Slyke cemetery states the following: "The history stars in 1816, when Peter C. Van Slyke moved from New York State to Indiana. Van Slyke purchased land in Greene County next to the White River. By the year 1824 he had in his possession at least sixty-two acres of land. He had some of his land cleared to allow settlers to stay for a season and rest on their travels to the west. At this time the county court was located in Burlington, Indiana. Due to a major shortage of water the area was unable to support the growing number of people. In 1824 State legislators appointed commissioners to meet and decide where the new county seat would be located. Van Slyke put in an offer to donate his land for the purpose of the new town. This was the best offer that the commissioners had received. They decided to make the land the county seat and to name it Bloomfield, after a city in New York."
- Shawnee Field is approximately five miles west of town.

=== Festivals ===
- Annual Bloomfield Apple Festival and Parade held typically on the first full weekend of October in the Bloomfield Town Park.
- Annual Christmas on the Square, Lighted Christmas Parade and Lighting of the Park is held in December.

== Notable people ==
- Obadiah J. Barker (1856–1908) – Born in Bloomfield; owner of Barker Brothers, at one time one of the world's biggest furniture stores.
- Dr. Thomas Bland (1830–1908) – Born in Bloomfield; Civil War surgeon and Indian Rights Activist.
- Don Herold (1889–1966) – Born in Bloomfield; writer and illustrator.
- Max Kidd (1901–1975) – Born in Bloomfield; Head Football Coach at Rose-Hulman (1959–61).
- Gerald W. Landis (1895–1971) – Born in Bloomfield; Teacher & U.S. Representative (1939–49).
- John Letsinger (1911–2002) – College Football Player at Purdue University (1931–32).
- Robert L. Letsinger (1921–2014) – Born in Bloomfield; Professor of Chemistry at Northwestern University (1946–91); best known for his research and development of chemical synthesis of DNA.
- Elmer Oliphant (1892–1975) – Born in Bloomfield; acclaimed college football player for Purdue and Army.
- Augustus Rhodes (1821–1918) – Lawyer in Bloomfield (1845–1854); married Elizabeth Cavins, daughter of Samuel Cavins, one of the first settlers of Bloomfield; later the 10th Chief Justice of the Supreme Court of California (1870–72).
- Lovell H. Rousseau (1818–1869) – Lawyer in Bloomfield 1841–1849; Indiana State Representative, Greene County (1844–46); Mexican War – Captain, Co. E, 2nd Indiana Infantry (Greene County); Indiana State Senator, Greene & Owen Counties (1847–50). Later Brevet Major General (Civil War), U.S. Congressman (1865–67), and Commander, Department of Louisiana.
- Richard H. Rousseau (1815–1872) – Lawyer in Bloomfield 1841–49; Indiana State Representative, Greene County (1848–49).
