= University of California law schools =

The five law schools in the University of California system, listed in order of establishment, are:

- University of California College of the Law, San Francisco, established in 1878
- University of California, Berkeley School of Law, established as a department in 1894 and as a law school in 1912
- University of California, Los Angeles School of Law, established in 1949
- University of California, Davis School of Law, established in 1965
- University of California, Irvine School of Law, established in 2007
