= Andrew Spielman =

American entomologist

- Born: 24 February 1930
- Died: 20 December 2006 (aged 76)
- Education: Johns Hopkins University; Colorado College
- Scientific career
- Fields: Medical entomology
- Workplaces: Harvard School of Public Health
- Thesis: The inheritance of autogeny in the Culex Pipiens complex of mosquitoes (1956)
- Doctoral advisor: Lloyd Eugene Rozeboom

Andrew Spielman (24 February 1930 – 20 December 2006) was a prominent American public health entomologist and Professor of Tropical Public Health in the Department of Immunology and Infectious Disease at the Harvard School of Public Health (HSPH).

Spielman was a world-renowned expert in the vector-borne illnesses malaria, Lyme disease, babesiosis and in the ways in which they are transmitted by mosquitoes and ticks. He was a major figure in the modern history of public health entomology.

== Early life and education ==
Spielman earned a B.S. in Zoology from Colorado College and an Sc.D. in Biology in the malaria lab at Johns Hopkins University in 1952, serving thereafter as a public health entomologist in the U.S. Navy (he left the service as a lieutenant commander).

== Career ==
Spielman became a member of the faculty at HSPH in 1959, where he divided his time between the lab and the field.

After George Healy, a researcher at the Centers for Disease Control, helped diagnose a second case of human babesiosis on Nantucket in 1973, Spielman traveled to the island for a series of visits to investigate the outbreaks of the disease which usually affects animals, destroying (like its relative malaria) their red blood cells.

Although a handful of human cases had been reported worldwide, babesiosis was not previously known as an established human disease. On Nantucket, he trapped voles and mice and picked ticks from the animals' hides. He then shifted to laboratory work, successfully infecting hamsters with the babesia protozoan through the bites of infected deer ticks (Ixodes dammini, a species he named).

By this approach, he was able to identify the tick responsible for what he called “Nantucket fever" (it was not Dermacentor variabilis, the dog tick, as alleged by other investigators) and to point to the white-footed mouse as the pathogen's reservoir. (Later, deer ticks were shown to be the vector of Lyme disease.)

In later years, he was granted an official title of Professor of Tropical Public Health under which he organized numerous symposia and consulted with governments, non-governmental organizations and corporations about the control of vector-borne diseases. He headed HSPH's research laboratory of Public Health Entomology and directed a training program in emerging infectious diseases for doctoral students and post-doctoral researchers. At Harvard Kennedy School, he directed the Malaria Epidemiology Program within the school's Center for International Development.

== Personal life ==
A mosquito expert with a productive career as a tick researcher, Spielman described himself, saying, "I am not a mosquito specialist. I am not a tick specialist. I am a transmission specialist".

Spielman was beloved as mentor to two generations of students and postdoctoral fellows whom he encouraged in his special brand of combined lab and fieldwork, the latter including a boyish excitement for intrepid adventures such as spelunking and climbing cliffs.

Spielman had three children (David, Deborah, and Sue) by his wife Judy; he had seven grandchildren (Madeline, Jacob, and Maya Beeders, Sara, Julia, Samantha, and Alex Spielman) at his death.

== Accomplishments and legacy ==
- Spielman was author of more than 360 publications on the arthropod-borne diseases malaria, dengue, babesiosis, Lyme disease, ehrlichiosis, eastern equine encephalitis, West Nile encephalitis, and filariasis.
  - First description of the life cycles and ecology of the agents of human babesiosis and Lyme disease
  - Elucidation of the role of saliva and its production in vectors such as ticks and mosquitoes in transmitting diseases
  - The first uses of growth regulators to interfere with normal mosquito development to aid mosquito control
  - The exploration of the possibility that roosting birds play a key part in perpetuating the viruses that cause eastern equine encephalitis virus and West Nile encephalitis.
  - Led the phase II testing of the SmithKline Beecham Lyme disease vaccine among residents of Nantucket, Martha's Vineyard, and Block Island.

=== Ixodes dammini ===
Ixodes dammini is responsible not only for the emergence of babesiosis in the U.S., but for a whole new group of tick-borne diseases, the best known of which is Lyme disease.

In 1979, Spielman officially proclaimed the Nantucket version of the deer tick a separate species, naming it Ixodes dammini after Gustave Dammin, a prominent pathologist at Brigham and Women's Hospital, because he had helped him with the research and was a property owner on Nantucket (Dammin's wife came from one of Nantucket's most prominent families).

Spielman built his case for I. dammini being a separate species from Ixodes scapularis on the observations that the two ticks had very distinct ranges (I. dammini in the Northeast, I. scapularis in the South) and that I. dammini was morphologically different, especially at the nymphal stage. He also marshaled DNA evidence to make his case.

Spielman fought a protracted, but probably ultimately losing, battle for I. dammini's identity as a separate species.

Siding with researchers in Georgia, the editors of the Journal of Medical Entomology officially ruled that, taxonomically, I. dammini is identical to I. scapularis and that the two species should be "synonymized" under Ixodes scapularis. Spielman disagreed, he asserted that maintaining I. dammini's separate identity is key to understanding the ecology and epidemiology of tick-borne diseases.

== Publications ==
- Spielman, Andrew and Michael D'Antonio (2001), Mosquito: A Natural History of Our Most Persistent and Deadly Foe, Hyperion.
