= Margaret A. Liu =

Physician-scientist

Margaret A. Liu (born June 11, 1956) is a physician and researcher studying gene expression, immune responses, and vaccines. From 2015 to 2017, Liu served as president of the International Society for Vaccines. She is currently a professor of microbiology and immunology at the University of California, San Francisco (UCSF) and a foreign adjunct professor at the Karolinska Institute in Stockholm, Sweden. Since June 7, 2017, she has been a director of Ipsen S.A. in France.

She is a founder of the field of DNA-based vaccines, and studies both plasmid DNA and mRNA vaccine technologies. She was the first researcher to provide evidence that gene-based immunization could protect against infectious diseases such as influenza, tuberculosis, HPV, and HIV. In addition to her work with animal models, she was involved with the first trial of a gene-based influenza vaccine in humans. In 2002, Discover magazine recognized Liu as one of the 50 most important women in science.

== Early life and education ==
Margaret's parents immigrated to the US from China for graduate school, and her mother moved her and her siblings to Durango, Colorado, after her father's death when Margaret was 4. They were one of the three Chinese families in the town. Growing up, Margaret's family struggled financially due to her father's death and racial prejudice making it hard for her mother to get jobs, despite her extensive education and qualifications. However, Margaret's childhood was a happy one, full of love from her mother and compassion for others. The support of her mother and the fairly diverse demographics of Durango inspired her to take risks in her career and life. She attended Durango High School, and also took advanced classes at Fort Lewis College starting at the age of 13. Even early in her education, she showed promise: her teachers recall that they knew that she was "going places". She graduated as Co-Valedictorian of the Class of 1973. She was a U.S. Presidential Scholar and received a Boettcher Scholarship, which fully funded her college degree. She turned down acceptances to Yale University and Princeton University, in part because of the scholarship providing a full ride to a college in Colorado.

She earned a B.A. in Chemistry, summa cum laude, at Colorado College. At Colorado College she discovered Biochemistry and Immunology, and also pursued her musical interests and played the flute for a woodwind quartet called the "Keytones" or the "Ketones". She completed her requirements and graduated a year early. She received a scholarship from the Rotary Foundation to study piano at a conservatory in Paris. She earned a Diplome d'Enseignement in piano from the École Normale de Musique de Paris.

She later obtained a Doctor of Medicine degree from Harvard Medical School. She completed her internship and residency training in internal medicine at Massachusetts General Hospital. She also completed a fellowship in endocrinology at Harvard. She became board certified in internal medicine and endocrinology and metabolism. While at Massachusetts General Hospital, she met her future husband, Robert Johnson, whom she married in 1983. She decided to keep her last name for professional reasons and because she thought that her race would surprise people if her name was Margaret Johnson.

== Career ==
Her first position was as an instructor at Harvard, with funding from a 5-year Physician Scientist NIH grant. During this time she also worked as a visiting scientist at Massachusetts Institute of Technology with Herman Eisen.

In addition to her work at Harvard Medical School, Liu has been a visiting scientist at Massachusetts Institute of Technology, an adjunct Assistant Professor at the University of Pennsylvania, an adjunct professor at the University of California, San Francisco, and a visiting professor at Karolinska Institute in Stockholm.

Liu has been the senior director of immunology at Merck Research Laboratories, West Point, Pennsylvania. At Merck, she worked with Maurice Hilleman who was one of her most influential mentors.

She has been a Vice President of vaccine research and gene therapy at Chiron Corporation, a Vice-Chairman at Transgène, an independent director of Ipsen, the president of the International Society for Vaccines from 2015 to 2017, and the Executive Vice-Chair of the International Vaccine Institute. She was a senior advisor of vaccinology at the Bill & Melinda Gates Foundation, where she was responsible for "monitoring and enhancing…and in identifying new opportunities for investment" for their billion-dollar vaccine programs and investments. During her time at the Gates Foundation, she worked part time at Transgène, realizing that she enjoyed splitting her time between organizations and jobs. She served as a member of the U.S. National Advisory Allergy and Infectious Diseases (NIAID) Council and was a member of the American Society for Clinical Investigation and a Fellow of the Molecular Medicine Society.

== Research ==
Liu develops novel approaches to vaccines and immune treatments for cancer. She pioneered the development of DNA vaccines, which may offer "the hope of better, more stable vaccines that can be rapidly produced." In response to the injection of DNA, the body may produce proteins that provoke an immune response, protecting against the virus. Some DNA vaccines are in clinical trials for humans. Others are already licensed for veterinary treatments.

== Awards and honors ==
- 2017, honorary Doctorate of Science, Karolinska Institute, Sweden
- 2002, Discover Magazine's 50 most important women in science

== See also ==
- RNA vaccine
- DNA vaccine
