= L. Song Richardson =

American legal scholar and lawyer

Song Richardson

President of Colorado College
- In office July 1, 2021 – June 30, 2024
- Preceded by: Mike Edmonds (acting); Robert Moore (acting)
- Succeeded by: Manya Whitaker

Personal details
- Born: 1966 or 1967 (age 58–59)
- Education: Harvard University (BA); Yale University (JD)
- Awards: Derrick Bell Award from the Association of American Law Schools (2012)

Leah Song Richardson (born 1967/1968) is an American lawyer, legal scholar, and higher education administrator who was formerly president of Colorado College. Before becoming president of Colorado College, she was dean and a chancellor's professor of law of the University of California, Irvine School of Law. After leaving her role as president of Colorado College, she returned to being a professor of law at the University of California, Irvine School of Law.

On February 7, 2024, Richardson announced that she would leave her role as President of Colorado College effective June 30, 2024.

== Education ==
Richardson earned a Bachelor of Arts degree from Harvard University and a Juris Doctor from Yale Law School.

== Career ==
Prior to academia, Richardson worked as a public defender and was a partner at the law firm of Schroeter Goldmark & Bender, where she practiced criminal defense. She was also an assistant counsel at the NAACP Legal Defense and Educational Fund.

Richardson assumed the role of UC Irvine School of Law's interim dean on July 1, 2017, replacing the school's founding dean, Erwin Chemerinsky. In January 2018, she was appointed the school's second dean. At the time of her appointment, she was the only woman of color to lead a top-30 law school. On December 9, 2020, Colorado College announced that Richardson had accepted the post of president of the college; she began her position on July 1, 2021. She is the first woman of color to serve as the school's president. Richardson served as President of Colorado College until June 30, 2024, when she resigned to return to her role as Professor of law at the University of California, Irvine School of Law.

On February 7, 2024, it was announced that Richardson would resign her position as President of Colorado College effective June 30, 2024, and return to her role as professor of law at the University of California, Irvine School of Law.

=== Writing and scholarship ===
Richardson's research focuses on implicit bias, criminal procedure, criminal law, and law and social science. She has examined implicit bias and prejudice in artificial intelligence technology. She co-edited the book "The Constitution and the Future of Criminal Justice in America," with John T. Parry of Lewis and Clark College, Portland. The book was published in 2014 by Cambridge University Press.

She is working on a forthcoming book examining the history of race in the United States, and implications for law and policy.

== Awards ==
Richardson received the Derrick Bell Award from the Association of American Law Schools in 2012. The award recognizes exceptional contributions to legal education through mentoring, teaching and scholarship.

In 2018, she was named among "OC People of 2018" by OC Weekly.

== Affiliations ==
Richardson is a member of the American Law Institute and serves on the executive committee of the Association of American Law Schools.

== Personal life ==
Richardson is African American and Asian American.
