= Lisa Diane Wedgeworth =

American artist (living person)

Lisa Diane Wedgeworth (born 20 November 1969) is an African-American visual artist, curator, and writer. Her work encompasses abstract painting, video, and performance works. She has been a teaching artist at several Los Angeles-area museums, including the California African American Museum, the Craft and Folk Art Museum, and LACMA. She earned her B.A. in studio art from California State University, Los Angeles, in 2002, and her M.F.A. in Studio Art from the same institution in 2014. In an interview with the magazine Curator in 2018, Wedgeworth cited childhood visits to the Barnsdall Art Park in the 1970s and 80s, and the Candice Bergen-narrated commercials for the Norton Simon Museum, as early influences. She also cites Lezley Saar, daughter of Betye Saar, as well as painter Suzanne Jackson and "outsider/self-taught artists." Wedgeworth's work is in the permanent collection of the California African American Museum.

== Career ==
In 2013, a video piece by Wedgeworth entitled Can You See Me? debuted as part of Out the Window, a public art project that shows "animations, documentaries, narratives and experimental videos about, by and in Los Angeles" on city buses.

From 2015-2016, Wedgeworth's curatorial project space PS 2920, in the Hyde Park neighborhood of Los Angeles, exhibited a number of emerging artists.

In 2016, Wedgeworth was named ArtSlant's Georgia Fee Artist-in-Residence, and spent June and July of that year in Paris building "a digital archive of essays, photographs, excerpts of narratives, and other relevant manifestations" of her residency project, The Necessity of French Cafés. Her blog for the project is entitled The Necessity of French Cafés, and comprises four blog posts that feature poetry, essays, sketches, and photography.

In 2017, Wedgeworth contributed to the project Animating the Archives, a multimedia endeavor responding to the history of the Woman's Building in Los Angeles, California. Wedgeworth's project was entitled Teach Your Daughters Well/Enseñe Bien a Sus Hijas, and "[collected] stories, rituals and traditions from women in exchange for a functional ARTifact to create an army of women who will remind their communities to teach (stimulate, empower, elevate, educate) their daughters well." Wedgeworth was one of fifteen artists to receive Metabolic Studio fellowships to produce work for Animating the Archives.

In 2018, Wedgeworth attended the Hermitage Artist Retreat in Englewood, Florida, where she produced a video work entitled The Calling. That year, she was also an artist-in-residence at the Camera Obscura Art Lab in Santa Monica, California, where she hosted workshops and discussions.

In 2020, Wedgeworth and fellow City of Los Angeles (COLA) Individual Artist Fellowship recipients exhibited their work at the Los Angeles Municipal Art Gallery in Barnsdall Art Park. The same year, Wedgeworth also participated in an exhibition of "female, non-binary, and trans artists" at Brand Library and Art Center in Glendale, CA.

As of 2022, Wedgeworth was executive director of Blue Roof Studios, an art space inside a former church in South Los Angeles that hosts one of the area's few urban artist residencies.
