= Mike Edmonds (educator) =

American academic administrator

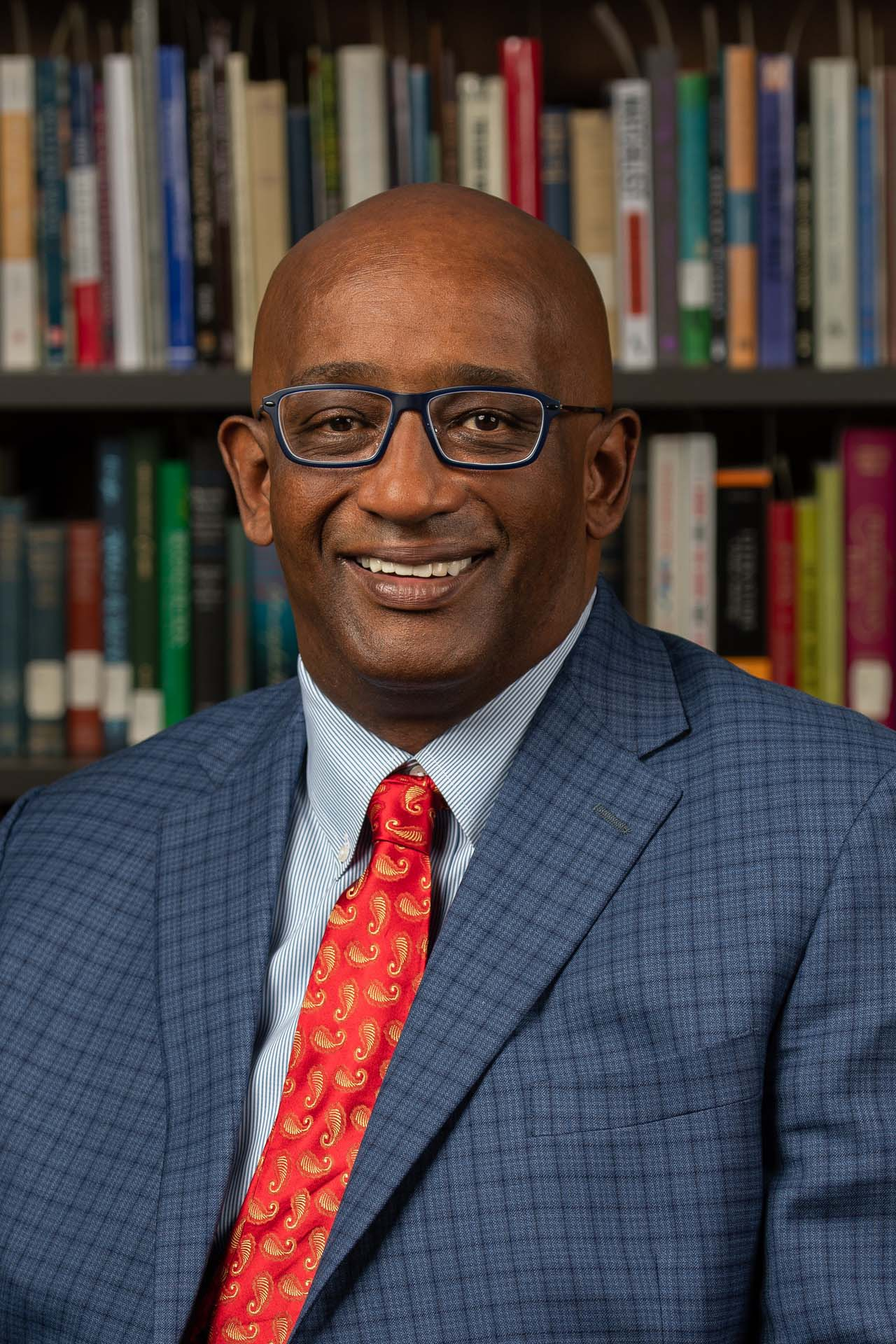

President of Colorado College
- Acting
- In office July 1, 2020 – July 1, 2021 Serving with Robert Moore
- Preceded by: Jill Tiefenthaler
- Succeeded by: Song Richardson

Personal details
- Born: Clarksville, Tennessee, U.S.
- Education: University of Mississippi (BA, MA, PhD)

Mike Edmonds is an American academic administrator, and former acting co-president of Colorado College, alongside former acting co-president Robert Moore and succeeding Jill M. Tiefenthaler. He served as co-president from July 2020 until July 1, 2021, at which point he became the Senior Vice President to Song Richardson. On June 9, 2022, Mike Edmonds announced that he would be retiring from Colorado College at the end of the 2022–23 school year.

== Early life and education ==
Originally from Clarksville, Tennessee, Edmonds attended the University of Mississippi in Oxford, Mississippi, where he earned two bachelor's degrees in theater arts and speech communication, as well as a master's degree and PhD in higher education.

== Career ==
In 1991, Edmonds was hired by Colorado College to be dean of students, and in 2005 was promoted to also be the vice president for student life. In July 2020, along with Colorado College senior vice president for finance and administration, Robert Moore, Edmonds was appointed as the acting co-president, and the first black president in the college's history. He served in this role until July 2021 at which point he became the Vice President and Chief of Staff to Colorado College's 14th President Song Richardson. He served in this role until early 2023, at which point he was placed as Senior Vice President of the President's Office. On June 9, 2022, Mike Edmonds announced that he would be retiring from Colorado College at the end of the 2022–23 school year.

== Awards ==
Edmonds is a University of Mississippi Hall of Fame graduate.

In 2012, the Barkley Forum at Emory University awarded him with a Gold Key award.

In 2019, he was inducted into the University of Mississippi School of Education Hall of Fame, as well as the National Speech and Debate Association Hall of Fame.
