= Greene County Courthouse (Indiana) =

- U.S. National Register of Historic Places
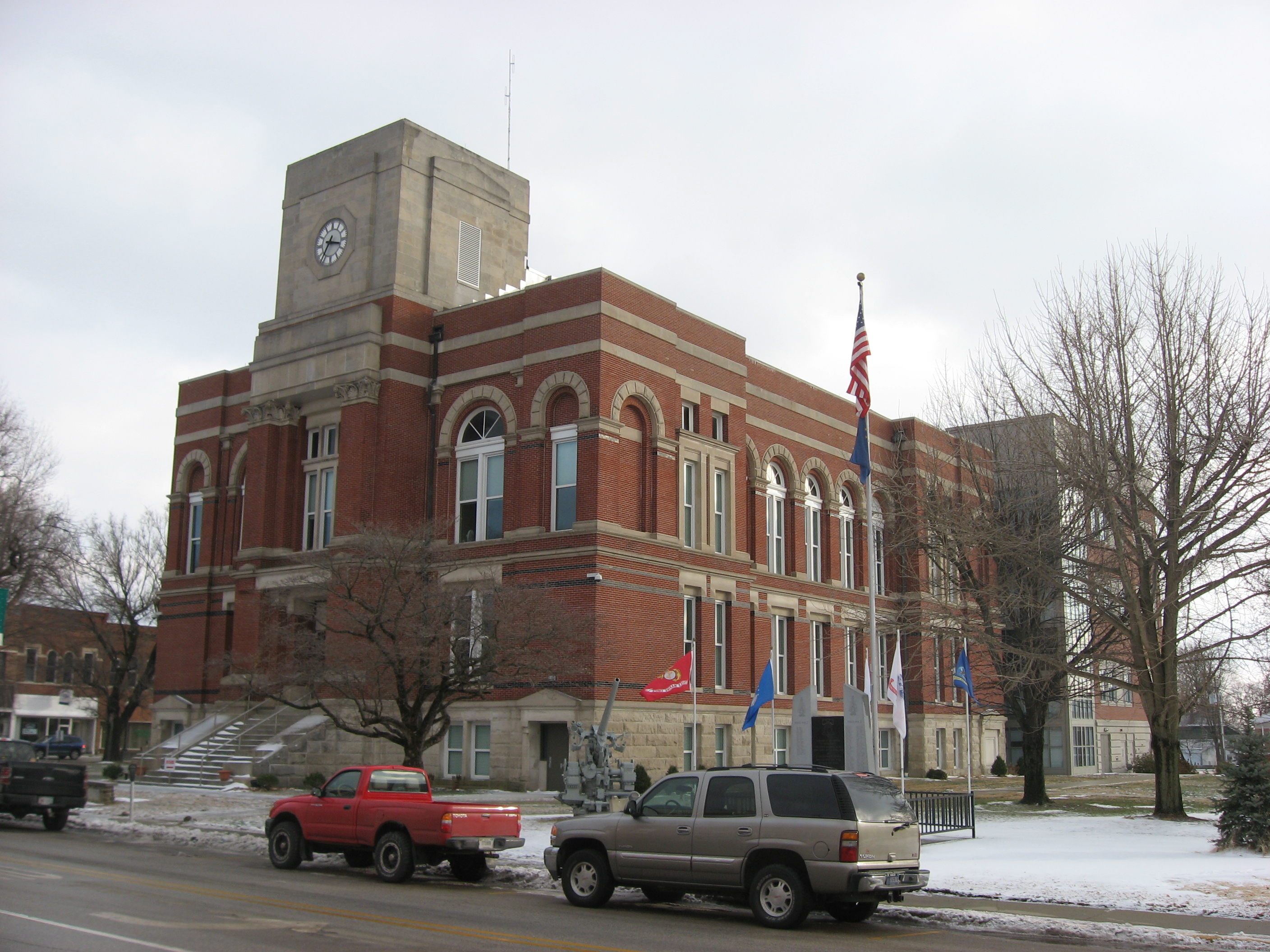
- Greene County Courthouse, December 2010

- Location within Indiana Location within the United States
- Location: Main and Washington Sts., Bloomfield, Indiana
- Coordinates: 39°1′34″N 86°56′17″W
- Area: less than one acre
- Built: 1885-1886
- Architect: Bunting, George; McKay & Bushman
- Architectural style: Classical Revival
- NRHP reference No.: 08000912
- Added to NRHP: September 17, 2008

Greene County Courthouse is a historic courthouse building located at Bloomfield, Indiana. It was designed by noted Indianapolis architect George W. Bunting and built in 1885–1886. It is a three-story, rectangular, Classical Revival style brick and stone building. It measures approximately 112 feet by 77 feet. The building has lost its original tower and corner turrets.

It was listed on the National Register of Historic Places in 2008.
