= Davis distribution =

Probability distribution for income sizes

- Parameters: $b>0$ scale $n> 0$ shape $\mu>0$ location
- Support: $x>\mu$
- PDF: $\frac{ b^n {(x-\mu)}^{-1-n} }{ \left( e^{\frac{b}{x-\mu}} -1 \right) \Gamma(n) \zeta(n) }$ Where $\Gamma(n)$ is the Gamma function and $\zeta(n)$ is the Riemann zeta function
- Mean: $$\begin{cases} \mu + \frac{b\zeta(n-1)}{(n-1)\zeta(n)} & \text{if}\ n>2    \\ \text{Indeterminate} & \text{otherwise}\ \end{cases}$$
- Variance: $$\begin{cases} \frac{ b^2 \left( -(n-2){\zeta(n-1)}^2+(n-1)\zeta(n-2)\zeta(n) \right)}{(n-2) {(n-1)}^2 {\zeta(n)}^2} & \text{if}\ n>3    \\ \text{Indeterminate} & \text{otherwise}\ \end{cases}$$

In statistics, the Davis distributions are a family of continuous probability distributions. It is named after Harold T. Davis (1892–1974), who in 1941 proposed this distribution to model income sizes. (The Theory of Econometrics and Analysis of Economic Time Series). It is a generalization of the Planck's law of radiation from statistical physics.

== Definition ==
The probability density function of the Davis distribution is given by

$$f(x;\mu,b,n)=\frac{ b^n {(x-\mu)}^{-1-n} }{ \left( e^{\frac{b}{x-\mu}} -1 \right) \Gamma(n) \zeta(n) }$$

where $\Gamma(n)$ is the Gamma function and $\zeta(n)$ is the Riemann zeta function. Here μ, b, and n are parameters of the distribution, and n need not be an integer.

== Background ==
In an attempt to derive an expression that would represent not merely the upper tail of the distribution of income, Davis required an appropriate model with the following properties

- $f(\mu)=0 \,$ for some $\mu>0 \,$
- A modal income exists
- For large x, the density behaves like a Pareto distribution:

$$f(x) \sim A {(x-\mu)}^{-\alpha-1} \, .$$

== Related distributions ==
- If $X \sim \mathrm{Davis}(b=1,n=4,\mu=0)\,$ then
  $\tfrac{1}{X} \sim \mathrm{Planck}$ (Planck's law)
