= Jesse Glenn Gray =

American philosopher

Jesse Glenn Gray (known as J. Glenn Gray; 1913–1977) was an American philosopher, writer, and professor of philosophy at Colorado College. Gray published numerous books and essays. His first major publication, The Warriors: Reflections on Men in Battle, is a philosophical memoir of his years as a counter-intelligence officer near the battle lines in Italy during World War II inspired by Gray’s opposition to war. Its reprint in 1967 and subsequent editions included an introduction by Hannah Arendt.

Gray was born May 27, 1913, near Mifflintown, Pennsylvania. He graduated from Juniata College and obtained an M.A. from the University of Pittsburgh in 1938 and a Ph.D. from Columbia University in 1941. Immediately after this, Gray spent four years in the United States Army, becoming a second lieutenant. When Gray returned to the United States he began his career as a professor. In 1947 Gray married Ursula Werner, with whom he had two daughters.

As a long-time professor at Colorado College, Gray obtained fellowships from the Ford Foundation, John Simon Guggenheim Memorial Foundation, and the National Council on the Arts and Humanities. He also was a scholar-in-residence for the Aspen Institute for Humanistic Studies from 1967 to 1968. As a general editor for Harper & Row, Gray supervised work for the publisher on translations of the German philosopher Martin Heidegger, with whom he formed a personal association, and was among his earliest champions in the United States. Colleagues at Colorado College and elsewhere compiled a collection of essays, entitled Something of Great Constancy, in honor of Gray. Prior to its publication, Gray died October 29, 1977, in Colorado Springs, Colorado.

== Bibliography ==
=== As author ===
- Hegel’s Hellenic Ideal. New York: King’s Crown Press, 1941.
- The Warriors: Reflections on Men in Battle. New York: Harcourt, 1959.
- The Promise of Wisdom: An Introduction to Philosophy of Education. Philadelphia: Lippincott, 1968. Reissued as Re-thinking American Education: A Philosophy of Teaching and Learning. Middletown, Conn.: Wesleyan University Press, 1984. Foreword by Elisabeth Young-Bruehl.
- Understanding Violence Philosophically and Other Essays. New York: Harper & Row, 1970.

=== As editor ===
- Hegel, Georg Wilhelm Friedrich. On Art, Religion, Philosophy: Introductory Lectures to the Realm of Absolute Spirit. New York: Harper & Row, 1970.

=== As translator ===
- Heidegger, Martin. What is Called Thinking? New York: Harper & Row, 1968.

=== As contributor ===
- McGrath, Earl. The Humanities in Higher Education. Dubuque: W.C. Brown, 1949.
- Kline, George L. European Philosophy Today. Chicago: Quadrangle Books, 1965.
- Anton, John. Naturalism and Historical Understanding. Albany: State University of New York Press, 1967.
- Somer, John, James Wilcox, and James Coulos. Literature and Rhetoric: an Anthology for Composition. Atlanta: Scott, Foresman, 1969.
