= Daniel Amneus =

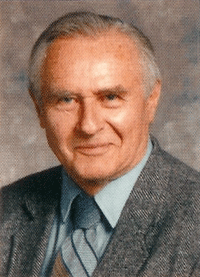
Photo of Amneus

Daniel Amneus (October 15, 1919 – December 18, 2003) was an emeritus professor of English at California State University, Los Angeles. He specialized in Shakespearean textual criticism. Amneus was the only man listed in Who's Who of American Women.

According to Richard Doyle, editor of The Liberator and author of the book The Rape of the Male, and president of Men's Defense Association, "Amneus is the leading theoretician and articulator of the Father's rights and Men's rights movements".

Amneus authored The Case for Father Custody and The Garbage Generation.
