= Thomas Cronin =

- Born: Thomas Edward Cronin; March 18, 1940 (age 86)

Academic background
- Education: Stanford University

Academic work
- Discipline: Political Scientist
- Sub-discipline: United States Presidency
- Institutions: Colorado College; Whitman College

Thomas Edward Cronin (born March 18, 1940) is a political scientist. He was president of Whitman College from 1993 to 2005. He was the McHugh Professor of American Institutions and Leadership at Colorado College. Cronin's field of study is the 'expanding power of the American presidency in the 20th century'. He has also written extensively on American elections, political novels and movies.

Cronin received his Ph.D. in political science from Stanford University.He served on the White House staff in 1966 and early 1967 as a White House Fellow. From 1969 to 1972, Cronin was a research associate at the Brookings Institution. In 1977, he was elected to the Common Cause National Governing Board. He later served on a dozen boards including, Cascade Natural Gas Corp., Monterey Institute of International Studies, Institute of American Studies and the Executive Council of the APSA. He served also as President of the Western Political Science Association and the APSA's Presidency Research Group. He won several awards for outstanding teaching, advising and research. He has been awarded three honorary Ph.D. degrees by Marietta College, Franklin College and Whitman College.

== Academic career ==
Cronin held an assistant professorship at the University of North Carolina from 1967 to 1970. From 1979 to 1993, he held an endowed chair at Colorado College. He was a member of the faculty and in 1991, was the acting president of the college. He took a visiting professorship at Princeton University in 1985 and 1986. From 1993 to 2005 Cronin served as President of Whitman College in Walla Walla, Washington. In 2005, Cronin returned to Colorado College to teach and to write. (According to one of his anecdotes, Colorado College called Cronin for guidance on whom to hire as his replacement; instead of providing them with recommendations, he informed the college that he would like to return as the "McHugh Professor of American Institutions and Leadership" at Colorado College). Official website—ThomasECronin.info He has been a long term contributing writer for the Rocky Mountain News, Denver Post, Colorado Sp-rings and Denver Gazette, ad Colorado Politics. He has also written for the New York Times, Seattle Times, Washington Post and TV guide and Science, among other journals.

== Fundraising ==
Cronin assisted in raising funds for the acquisition of the Baca campus and the building of the Lodge there by Colorado College.

== Published works ==
- The Presidential Advisory System (Harper & Row, 1969)
- The Presidency Reappraised (Praeger, 1974, 1977)
- The State of the Presidency (Little Brown, 1980)
- US v. Crime in the Streets (Indiana, 1981)
- Inventing the American Presidency (Kansas, 1989)
- Direct Democracy (Harvard, 1989)
- Colorado Politics and Government (Nebraska, 1993) new edition 2013.
- The Paradoxes of the American Presidency (Oxford University Press, 1998, 6th edition 2020)
- Government by the People (Prentice-Hall, 2000)--multiple editions including a Chinese language edition.
- State and Local Politics (Prentice-Hall, 2000)
- On The Presidency (Paradigm, 2009)
- "Leadership Matters" (Paradigm and Rutledge, 2012)
- Imagining a Great Republic (Rowman & Littlefield Publishers 2018)
- "Writing as a Performing Art (Abuzz-Booklocker Press, 2020)
