= Obadiah J. Barker =

American businessman

- Born: October 31, 1856; Bloomfield, Indiana
- Died: July 1908 (aged 51)

Obadiah J. Barker Jr. (October 31, 1856 – July 1908) was a Los Angeles businessman and the founder and president of the furniture company, Barker Brothers. Born in Bloomfield, Indiana, Barker moved with his family to Colorado Springs, Colorado as a young man. He attended Colorado College and also attended dental school in St. Louis. However, he did not complete dental school and moved to Los Angeles with his parents and brothers in 1880. The family began a successful furniture business, originally O.T. Barker and Sons in the Van Nuys Building at Spring and Seventh Street in downtown Los Angeles. The company became one of the world's biggest house-furnishing stores. The name was changed to Barker Brothers in 1898 and moved in 1909 to Broadway and Eighth Street. Barker died suddenly at the Lankershim Hotel in July 1908 at age 51.
