= Harold Thayer Davis =

American mathematician

- Born: October 5, 1892; Beatrice, Nebraska, US
- Died: November 14, 1974 (aged 82); Bloomington, Indiana, US
- Education: University of Wisconsin-Madison; Harvard University; Colorado College
- Scientific career
- Workplaces: Northwestern University; Indiana University Bloomington
- Doctoral advisor: Edward Burr Van Vleck

Harold Thayer Davis (5 October 1892 in Beatrice, Nebraska – 14 November 1974 in Bloomington, Indiana) was a mathematician, statistician, and econometrician, known for the Davis distribution.

Davis received in 1915 his A.B. from Colorado College, in 1919 his A.M. from Harvard University, and in 1926 his PhD under Edward Burr Van Vleck from the University of Wisconsin, after working there as a mathematics instructor from 1920 to 1923. From 1923 to 1937 he taught mathematics at the Indiana University Bloomington, becoming a professor there. From February to August 1937 he was acting research director of the Cowles Commission. Davis became a professor in 1937 at Northwestern University in the mathematics department and the chair of the department in 1942. He was the author of many articles in refereed journals and numerous books and monographs.

Davis was an associate editor of Econometrica, Isis, and the Bulletin of the American Mathematical Society. He was elected a Fellow the Econometric Society.

== Selected publications ==
=== Articles ===
- Davis, H. T. (1922). "Relating to the proof of an existence theorem for a certain type of boundary value problem". Bull. Amer. Math. Soc. 28 (8): 390–394. doi:10.1090/s0002-9904-1922-03596-3. MR 1560592.
- "An existence theorem for the characteristic numbers of a certain value boundary problem". Trans. Amer. Math. Soc. 26 (1): 1–16. 1924. doi:10.1090/s0002-9947-1924-1501261-5. MR 1501261.
- Davis, H. T. (1935). "An extension to polygamma functions of a theorem of Gauss". Bull. Amer. Math. Soc. 41 (4): 243–247. doi:10.1090/s0002-9904-1935-06055-0. MR 1563067.

=== Books ===
- The Volterra Integral Equation. 1930.
- Philosophy and Modern Science. The Principia press. 1931.
- Tables of the Higher Mathematical Functions. Vol. I. 1933.; Vol. II. 1935.
- with F. C. Nelson: Elements of Statistics. 1935.
- A Course in General Mathematics. The Principia press. 1935.
- Theory of Linear Operators. 1936.
- The Theory of Econometrics. 1941.
- The Analysis of Economic Time Series. Principia Press of Trinity University. 1941.
- Political Statistics. Principia Press of Illinois. 1948.
- Essays in the History of Mathematics. 1948.
- Differential Equations and Mathematical Physics. 1949.
- Quantitative Aspects of the Action of Carcinogenic Substances. 1951.
- Quantitative Aspects of the Carcinogenic Radiations. 1952.
- Introduction to Nonlinear Differential and Integral Equations. 1962.
