= Jill Tiefenthaler =

American economist

CEO of National Geographic Society
- In office August 2020 – present
- Preceded by: Gary Knell

13th President of Colorado College
- In office July 2011 – July 2020
- Preceded by: Dick Celeste
- Succeeded by: Mike Edmonds (acting); Robert Moore (acting)

Personal details
- Born: 1965 (age 60–61) Iowa, U.S.
- Education: Saint Mary's College (BA); Duke University (MA, PhD)

Jill Tiefenthaler (born 1965) is an American academic and economist who is the first female CEO of the National Geographic Society. Previously, Tiefenthaler was the 13th president of Colorado College from July 2011 to 2020 and the provost of Wake Forest University.

== Early life and education ==
Tiefenthaler is the daughter of a popcorn farmer from Breda, Iowa. In 1987, she earned her bachelor's degree in economics from Saint Mary's College in Notre Dame, Indiana. She received her master's and doctoral degrees in economics from Duke University in 1989 and 1991, respectively.

== Career ==
Tiefenthaler joined the faculty of Colgate University in Hamilton, New York in 1991. Eventually becoming professor of economics and senior adviser to the president, she chaired the economics department from 2000 to 2003, and from 2003 to 2006 she served as associate dean of the faculty. In 2010 she was inducted as a faculty/staff initiate of Omicron Delta Kappa at Wake Forest University.

Tiefenthaler is a scholar in the discipline of the economics of higher education.

=== Colorado College ===
During her first year at Colorado College, Tiefenthaler undertook a "Year of Listening" to gather broad community input about the college's strengths, challenges, and opportunities. Over the year, she visited Colorado Springs, Boulder, Denver, Boston, Minneapolis, Chicago, Los Angeles, Seattle, Portland, San Francisco, Washington, D.C., Greenwich, Connecticut, and New York to gather over 2,000 comments about what makes Colorado College a distinct liberal arts college. She then went on to be president, where she earned the loving nickname Chief Tief from students.

=== National Geographic Society ===
On January 14, 2020, Tiefenthaler announced she would be stepping down as president of Colorado College to become CEO of the National Geographic Society. She is the first woman to serve in this position, making history at the Society.

== Personal life ==
Tiefenthaler is married to Kevin Rask, an economics research professor at Colorado College. They have two children.
