= Edward Diller =

- Born: December 14, 1925; Cleveland, Ohio, US
- Died: March 30, 1985 (age 59); Eugene, Oregon, US
- Occupations: University Professor, author
- Known for: German scholarship
- Spouse: Lois Kater Diller (m 1955–1985; his death)
- Awards: visiting Fulbright Lecturer to Germany in 1967; Fulbright research grant in 1977 for work in Freiburg, Germany

Edward Diller (December 14, 1925 – March 30, 1985) was a Professor of Germanic Languages and Literature at the University of Oregon and an author.

== Early years and education ==
Diller was born in Cleveland, Ohio, United States, youngest of six children of Isaac Diller, who immigrated to the US in 1910 from Austria-Hungary and worked in a hat factory, and Frieda Diller. Two of Isaac and Frieda's older children, Louis and Max, also worked in the hat factory. Edward Diller served in the U.S. Marine Corps during World War II. He received a bachelor's degree in 1953 from the University of California at Los Angeles, a master's degree in 1954 from California State University, Los Angeles, and his doctorate in 1961 from Middlebury College in Vermont, with a dissertation entitled "Die Gedankenwelt von Friedrich Dürrenmatt" (The thought of Friedrich Dürrenmatt).

== Academic career ==
Diller taught German at Beverly Hills High School during the 1950s and 1960s, and was foreign language coordinator of the Beverly Hills Unified School District, before joining the faculty of Colorado College. He moved to the University of Oregon in 1965, was director of the University of Oregon Robert D. Clark Honors College from 1972–77, and assistant dean of the College of Liberal Arts from 1974–77.

Diller won grants from the National Endowment for the Humanities and the National Science Foundation for projects in film studies and for attempts to open lines of communication, especially about the humanities, between Oregon Indian tribes and white residents. Shortly before his death, he and an Oregon colleague were awarded a National Endowment for the Humanities grant to fund summer seminars for high school teachers at the Eugene campus.

Diller was resident director of the Oregon Study Center in Stuttgart, West Germany, for the 1980-81 academic year, president of the American Association of Teachers of German from 1978–1980, on the Executive Board of the Joint National Committee for Languages from 1979–80, and chairman of the Selection Committee of the Federal Republic of Germany and the U.S. Office of Education Grants in 1979. Diller also served on the board of Trustees for the American Council on German Studies in 1977.

== Honors and publications ==
Diller was a visiting Fulbright Program Lecturer to Germany in 1967 and received a Fulbright research grant in 1977 for work in Freiburg, Germany. He was awarded Fulbright Research Professorships in Braunschweig and Regensburg and was named Carl Schurz Visiting Professor at the University of Dortmund in 1970. An active scholar, Diller wrote several books, articles and book reviews, and contributed to Spanish, French and German textbooks.
