= Index of biodiversity articles =

This is a list of topics in biodiversity.

== A ==
Abiotic stress — Adaptation — Agricultural biodiversity — Agroecological restoration — All-taxa biodiversity inventory — Alpha diversity — Applied ecology — Arca-Net — ASEAN Center for Biodiversity — ASEAN Heritage Parks — Aquatic biomonitoring — Axe Lake Swamp State Nature Preserve —

== B ==
Bank of Natural Capital — Beta diversity — BioBlitz — Biocomplexity — Biocultural diversity — Biodiversity action plan — Biodiversity and drugs — Biodiversity and food — Biodiversity banking — Biodiversity databases (list) — Biodiversity hotspot — Biodiversity in Israel, the West Bank, and the Gaza Strip — Biodiversity Indicators Partnership — Biodiversity informatics — Biodiversity Monitoring Switzerland — Biodiversity of Borneo — Biodiversity of Cape Town — Biogeography — Bioindicator — Bioinformatics — BIOPAT - Patrons for Biodiversity — Biorisk — Biosafety Clearing-House — BioSearch — Biota by conservation status (list) — Biosurvey — BioWeb — Body size and species richness — Box corer — Bray–Curtis dissimilarity —

== C ==
Caribbean Initiative — Carta di Siracusa on Biodiversity — Cartagena Protocol on Biosafety — Center for Biological Diversity — Centres of Plant Diversity — Chresonym — Comisión Nacional para el Conocimiento y Uso de la Biodiversidad — Conservation Biology — Conservation Commons — Conservation ethic — Conservation in Papua New Guinea — Conservation reliant species — Conservation status — Conservation status (biota - list) — Convention on Biological Diversity — Critically Endangered — Crop diversity —

== D ==
Data Deficient — Deforestation — Diversitas — Diversity-function debate — Diversity index —

== E ==
ECNC-European Centre for Nature Conservation — Ecological economics — Ecological effects of biodiversity — Ecological goods and services — Ecological restoration — Ecology — Economics of biodiversity — Ecosystem diversity — EDGE species (list) — Effect of climate change on plant biodiversity — Eichler's rule — Endemic Bird Areas of the World: Priorities for Biodiversity Conservation — Endemic Species in Slovakia — Endemism — Enzootic — Ethnic diversity — Ewens sampling formula — Extinct in the Wild — Extinction —

== F ==
Felidae Conservation Fund — Flora and vegetation of Turkey — Forest farming — Functional agrobiodiversity —

== G ==
Gamma diversity — Gene pool — Genetic diversity — Genetic erosion — Genetic pollution — Global 200 — Global Biodiversity Information Facility — Global biodiversity — Global Crop Diversity Trust — Global warming — Green Revolution —

== H ==
Habitat conservation — Habitat fragmentation — Heirloom plant — Heirloom tomato — Holocene extinction event —

== I ==
Indicator species — Indicator value — Insect biodiversity — Intact forest landscape — Inter-American Biodiversity Information Network — Intergovernmental Science-Policy Platform on Biodiversity and Ecosystem Services — Intermediate Disturbance Hypothesis — International Cooperative Biodiversity Group — International Council for Game and Wildlife Conservation — International Day for Biological Diversity — International Institute of Tropical Agriculture — International Mechanism of Scientific Expertise on Biodiversity — International Treaty on Plant Genetic Resources for Food and Agriculture — International Union for Conservation of Nature — International Year of Biodiversity — IUCN Red List — IUCN Red List vulnerable species (list) —

== K ==
Key Biodiversity Areas —

== L ==
Land use, land-use change and forestry — Langtang National Park — Latitudinal gradients in species diversity — Least Concern — List of biodiversity databases — List of environmental issues — List of environmental topics — Livestock Keepers' Rights — Living Planet Index — Local Biodiversity Action Plan —

== M ==
Man and the Biosphere Programme — Measurement of biodiversity — Measurement of biodiversity (list) — Megadiverse countries — Millennium Ecosystem Assessment — Millennium Seed Bank Project — Monoculture — Monodominance — Mutation —

== N ==
NaGISA — National Biodiversity Centre (Singapore) — National Biodiversity Network — National Biological Information Infrastructure — Native Vegetation Management Framework — Natural environment — Natural heritage — Natural landscape — Nature — Nature Conservation Act vulnerable flora of Queensland (list) — NatureServe — NatureServe conservation status — Near Threatened — Niche apportionment models — Not Evaluated — Nutritional biodiversity — NatureServe vulnerable species (list) —

== O ==
Occupancy–abundance relationship — Organic farming and biodiversity —

== P ==
Park Grass Experiment — Parsa National Park — Phylogenetic diversity — Plant Resources of Tropical Africa —

== R ==
Range condition scoring — Rank abundance curve — Rare species — Rarefaction (ecology) — Reconciliation ecology — RECOrd (Local Biological Records Centre) — Regional Red List — Relative species abundance — Renkonen similarity index —

== S ==
Satoyama — SAVE Foundation — Seedbank — Seedy Sunday — Shivapuri Nagarjun National Park — Soil biodiversity — Species evenness — Species richness — Subsurface Lithoautotrophic Microbial Ecosystem — Sustainability — Sustainable development — Sustainable forest management —

== T ==
The Economics of Ecosystems and Biodiversity — Threatened species —

== U ==
Unified neutral theory of biodiversity — United Nations Decade on Biodiversity — University of California, Riverside Herbarium —

== V ==
Vulnerable animals — Vulnerable fauna of the United States — Vulnerable flora of Queensland, Nature Conservation Act list — Vulnerable plants — Vulnerable species — Vulnerable species, IUCN Red List — Vulnerable species, NatureServe (list) —

== W ==
Wild Solutions — Wildlife preserve — Wooded meadow — World Conservation Monitoring Centre — World Conservation Union — World Forestry Congress — World Network of Biosphere Reserves —

== Y ==
Yasuni National Park

== See also ==
- Index of evolutionary biology articles
