= Site of nature conservation interest =

Designation by UK local authorities

Site of nature conservation interest (SNCI), site of importance for nature conservation (SINC) and regionally important geological site (RIGS) are designations used by local authorities in the United Kingdom for sites of substantive local nature conservation and geological value. The Department for Environment, Food and Rural Affairs has recommended the generic term 'local site', which is divided into 'local wildlife site' and 'local geological site'.

There are approximately 35,000 local sites, and according to the former Minister for Biodiversity, Jim Knight, they make a vital contribution to delivering the UK Biodiversity Action Plan and Local Biodiversity Action Plans and national and Local Geodiversity Action Plans, as well as maintaining local natural character and distinctiveness. Sites of Special Scientific Interest (SSSIs) and local nature reserves (LNRs) have statutory protection, but they are only intended to cover a representative selection of sites, and local sites are intended to provide comprehensive coverage of sites of nature conservation value. Local sites do not have statutory protection (unless they are also SSSIs or LNRs), but local authorities are expected to take account of the need to protect them in deciding their planning and development policies.

== Selection method ==
Local sites are designated by local authorities in cooperation with Wildlife Trusts, RIGS Groups or Geology Trusts, or their equivalents. For example, in Kent, local wildlife sites are identified by the Kent Wildlife Trust). Selection is objective and is normally based upon a recent survey specifically designed for SNCI, but selection on the basis of existing, published information may also occur. The approach is similar to that used for the selection of biological SSSIs, but the thresholds are lower.

Selection is primarily for habitats of inherent wildlife interest, but some sites may be selected for supporting rare or scarce species of plants or animals outside such habitats. The areas concerned may be areas of 'natural' habitats, or they may be man-made – for example, the 40-acre (160,000 m^{2}) West Norwood Cemetery is designated a site of metropolitan importance for nature conservation by the London Borough of Lambeth

Once identified, designation and protection of the areas are done by local authorities through planning policies in their development plans. National government guidance (PPS 9) requires all development plans to include such policies. The variation in names for the designation reflects its separate existence in the different development plans for different areas.

In some areas, the designation is subdivided, or additional, more local designations are also used. For example, in Greater London SINCs are divided into the following grades:

- Site of metropolitan importance for nature conservation
- Site of borough importance for nature conservation (grade I and grade II)
- Site of local importance for nature conservation

== See also ==
- Site of Special Scientific Interest
- Local nature reserve
