= John Klironomos =

- Occupations: Plant and soil microbial ecologist, and academic
- Awards: Humboldt Research Award, Alexander von Humboldt Foundation (2007); Professional Achievement Award, International Soil Ecology Society (2013); Fellow, American Association for the Advancement of Science (2013); Fellow, Royal Society of Canada, Academy of Science (2014)

Academic background
- Education: B.Sc. Biology; Ph.D. Biology
- Alma mater: Concordia University; University of Waterloo
- Thesis: Influences of microarthropods on the functioning of endomycorrhizal associations (1994)

John Klironomos is a Canadian plant and microbial ecologist and academic who is a Professor of Biology at the American University of Sharjah (AUS).

Klironomos's research focuses on the causes and consequences of plant and fungal diversity in terrestrial ecosystems. His work spans various subjects, including the feedback between plant and fungal populations, the impact of soil microbes on plant diversity and ecosystem services, and the potential for microbes to boost productivity in agriculture and forestry, as well as to restore disturbed ecosystems.

Klironomos has received the Humboldt Research Award and the Soil Ecology Society Professional Achievement Award. He is a Fellow of the American Association for the Advancement of Science and Royal Society of Canada, Academy of Science.

== Education ==
Klironomos earned his B.Sc. in Biology from Concordia University in 1990 and completed his Ph.D. in the same field from the University of Waterloo in 1994 under the supervision of mycologist W. Bryce Kendrick. From 1994 to 1996, he served as a Postdoctoral Fellow at San Diego State University.

== Career ==
After completing his postdoctoral studies, Klironomos began his academic career as an assistant professor at the University of Guelph and was later appointed as an associate professor, a role he held until 2006. Concurrently, he was a Bullard Research Fellow at Harvard University, Canada Research Chair at the University of Guelph where he was promoted to Professor in 2006. He also served as a visiting professor at Université Paul Sabatier in France and received a Humboldt Research Fellowship at Free University Berlin in 2008. Transitioning to the University of British Columbia, Okanagan Campus (UBC Okanagan), he briefly served as Director of the Institute for Species at Risk and Habitat Studies from 2012 to 2013 and as Associate Dean of Research at the Barber School of Arts and Sciences from 2013 to 2015. After retiring as a professor of biology at UBC Okanagan, he has been serving as a professor of biology at AUS since 2023.

Klironomos was President of the International Soil Ecology Society and the vice-president and President Elect of the International Mycorrhizal Society from 2017 to 2020.

== Research ==
Klironomos' research focuses on the ecological roles of soil microbes, particularly mycorrhizal fungi, in plant health and ecosystem sustainability. His work explores how these interactions can be harnessed to improve ecosystem resilience, enhance food security, and promote biodiversity in the face of environmental changes.

=== Mycorrhizal fungal dynamics ===
Klironomos and his group underscored the role of mycorrhizal fungi in shaping plant community dynamics and ecosystem structure. He demonstrated that arbuscular mycorrhizal fungi (AMF) diversity is crucial for maintaining plant biodiversity and ecosystem functioning, showcasing how higher AMF diversity enhances plant biodiversity. Building on this, they revealed that AMF modulate the relationship between plant diversity and productivity, showing a positive but asymptotic trend that suggests AMF improve nutrient utilization and contribute to species redundancy. Further exploration revealed that plant growth responses to mycorrhizal fungi exhibit significant variability from parasitic to mutualistic interactions especially when locally adapted plant and fungal species are used. His group then proposed applying a life history classification framework to arbuscular mycorrhizal fungi, akin to Grime's C-S-R model for plants, to better understand their functional diversity, successional dynamics, and species associations. In a 2017 study, they indicated that mycorrhizal type significantly affects plant-soil feedbacks, with arbuscular mycorrhizal trees showing negative feedback and strong conspecific inhibition, while ectomycorrhizal trees exhibited positive feedback and conspecific facilitation.

Studies by Klironomos and colleagues on the invasive plant Alliaria petiolata demonstrated how it disrupts mutualistic mycorrhizal associations, leading to suppressed native plant growth and facilitating its own invasion into North American forests. Furthermore, they revealed that Alliaria petiolata has a more pronounced inhibitory effect on mycorrhizal fungi and native plants in North America compared to Europe, attributed to specific flavonoid compounds. In a collaborative meta-analysis, they found that plant responses to mycorrhizal inoculation are most affected by host plant type and nitrogen fertilization, with variations dependent on soil complexity, plant functional groups, and nutrient limitations.

=== Plant-soil microbe interactions ===
Klironomos and co-researchers revealed that plant-soil microbe interactions greatly influence species abundance in plant communities, with rare plants suffering from pathogen accumulation and invasive plants benefiting from mycorrhizal fungi. Demonstrating the challenges and limitations in methods for studying soil microbial diversity, they stressed the importance of accurate assessment techniques for linking microbial diversity to ecosystem functions. By integrating microbial interactions into plant community ecology, they expanded models of niche and feedback, emphasizing soil microbes' role in plant dynamics. Further work showed that soil microbes affect the diversity–productivity relationship in grasslands, where increased plant diversity reduces disease and enhances productivity, highlighting microbial interactions over niche complementarity. In reviewing plant-soil feedbacks, they emphasized their role in community dynamics, invasions, and climate change responses, advocating for more integrated, long-term studies to improve ecological predictions and management.

=== Ecosystem integration ===
Klironomos and colleagues have highlighted the importance of integrating both aboveground and belowground perspectives in developing effective strategies for ecosystem management and restoration. They demonstrated how aboveground and belowground components of ecosystems are intricately linked, with both influencing community and ecosystem processes through complex feedbacks. Highlighting the significant impact of exotic plant invasions on soil communities, they stressed the need for a thorough understanding of aboveground and belowground interactions to effectively manage and restore invaded ecosystems.

== Awards and honors ==
- 2007 – Humboldt Research Award, Alexander von Humboldt Foundation
- 2013 – Professional Achievement Award, International Soil Ecology Society
- 2013 – Fellow, American Association for the Advancement of Science
- 2014 – Fellow, Royal Society of Canada, Academy of Science

== Selected articles ==
- Van Der Heijden, M. G., Klironomos, J. N., Ursic, M., Moutoglis, P., Streitwolf-Engel, R., Boller, T., ... & Sanders, I. R. (1998). Mycorrhizal fungal diversity determines plant biodiversity, ecosystem variability and productivity. Nature, 396(6706), 69–72.
- Klironomos, J. N., & Hart, M. M. (2001). Animal nitrogen swap for plant carbon. Nature, 410(6829), 651–652.
- Klironomos, J. N. (2002). Feedback with soil biota contributes to plant rarity and invasiveness in communities. Nature, 417(6884), 67–70.
- Klironomos, J. N. (2003). Variation in plant response to native and exotic arbuscular mycorrhizal fungi. Ecology, 84(9), 2292–2301.
- Wardle, D. A., Bardgett, R. D., Klironomos, J. N., Setälä, H., Van Der Putten, W. H., & Wall, D. H. (2004). Ecological linkages between aboveground and belowground biota. science, 304(5677), 1629–1633.
- Klironomos, J. N., Allen, M. F., Rillig, M. C., Piotrowski, J., Makvandi-Nejad, S., Wolfe, B. E., & Powell, J. R. (2005). Abrupt rise in atmospheric CO_{2} overestimates community response in a model plant–soil system. Nature, 433(7026), 621–624.
- Maherali, H., & Klironomos, J. N. (2007). Influence of phylogeny on fungal community assembly and ecosystem functioning. science, 316(5832), 1746–1748.
- Pringle, A., Bever, J. D., Gardes, M., Parrent, J. L., Rillig, M. C., & Klironomos, J. N. (2009). Mycorrhizal symbioses and plant invasions. Annual Review of Ecology, Evolution, and Systematics, 40(1), 699–715.
- Fraser, L. H., Pither, J., Jentsch, A., Sternberg, M., Zobel, M., Askarizadeh, D., ... & Zupo, T. (2015). Worldwide evidence of a unimodal relationship between productivity and plant species richness. Science, 349(6245), 302–305.
- Bennett, J. A., Maherali, H., Reinhart, K. O., Lekberg, Y., Hart, M. M., & Klironomos, J. (2017). Plant-soil feedbacks and mycorrhizal type influence temperate forest population dynamics. Science, 355(6321), 181–184.
