= Taynish National Nature Reserve =

Nature reserve in Argyll and Bute, Scotland

- IUCN category II (national park)
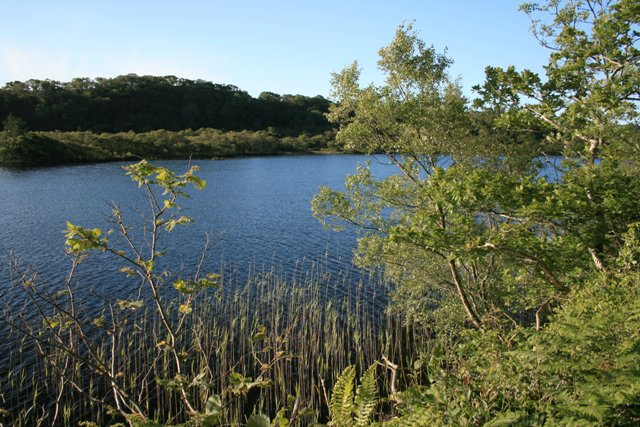
- Lochan Taynish

- Location within Argyll and Bute
- Location: Tayvallich, Argyll and Bute, Scotland
- Coordinates: 56.007°N 5.631°W
- Area: 370 ha (910 acres)
- Established: 1977
- Governing body: NatureScot
- Website: Taynish National Nature Reserve

Taynish National Nature Reserve (Scottish Gaelic: Tèarmann Nàdair Nàiseanta Taighnis) is situated southwest of the village of Tayvallich in the council area of Argyll and Bute on the west coast of Scotland. The reserve encompasses almost all of the Taynish peninsula, which is around 5 km long and 1 km wide. The woodlands at Taynish are often described as a 'temperate rainforest', benefiting from the mild and moist climate brought about by the Gulf Stream. Taynish is owned and managed by NatureScot and was declared a national nature reserve (NNR) in 1977. The reserve was formerly also a biosphere reserve, but this status was withdrawn in 2014.

NatureScot provide a car park and three waymarked trails for visitors, the Barr Mòr Trail, Woodland Trail and the Coastal Trail. In 2015 it was estimated that around 9,500 people visited the reserve each year, down from a high of over 10,000 visitors in 2009/10.

== Flora ==
Around three-quarters of Taynish NNR is wooded, dominated by ancient sessile oak woodland, with smaller areas of birch, alder and ash. During the nineteenth century the woodland was managed for charcoal production and to produce oak bark for the tanning industry. Trees were coppiced, and the woods were managed to favour the growth of oak over other species.

The warm, wet climate, along with the humid woodland environment, provides ideal conditions for ferns, mosses and liverworts to thrive, with over 250 species of mosses and liverworts recorded at the reserve. Furthermore, 475 lichen species have been recorded at Taynish NNR, including 91 nationally scarce species. Other plants of note include the narrow-leaved helleborine, a United Kingdom Biodiversity Action Plan (UKBAP) and Local Biodiversity Action Plan (LBAP) species of orchid.

== Fauna ==
The habitat mosaic at Taynish NNR gives rise to a large number of invertebrate species, including butterflies, dragonflies, moths, beetles and other groups of insects. One particularly noteworthy species is the marsh fritillary butterfly, one of the most threatened butterfly species in Europe. 450 species of moth have also been found at the reserve, three of which are UKBAP species, as well as 13 species of dragonfly.

The reserve also supports a thriving otter population, which are regularly seen foraging down by the shore. Other mammals at Taynish NNR include red squirrels, pipistrelle bats and a very small resident population of deer. The range of woodland and mosaic of habitats at Taynish NNR also gives rise to a large breeding bird community, including six UK Biodiversity Action Plan species: reed bunting, spotted flycatcher, skylark, bullfinch, linnet and song thrush. Golden eagles, sea eagles and osprey have also been seen over the Taynish peninsula.

== Conservation designations ==
The national nature reserve is classified as a Category II protected area by the International Union for Conservation of Nature. In addition to the NNR status Taynish also holds a number of other conservation designations, being designated as a Site of Special Scientific Interest (SSSI) entitled Taynish Woods and forming part of the Taynish and Knapdale Woods Special Area of Conservation (SAC). Taynish also lies within the Knapdale National Scenic Area.

=== Taynish Biosphere Reserve ===
Taynish was formerly designated as a biosphere reserve, however this status was withdrawn in 2014. The biosphere reserve designation has since been refocused to cover larger areas, subdivided into core, buffer and transition zones, and as of 2019 Scotland has two designated biospheres: Wester Ross, and Galloway and Southern Ayrshire.

The listing noted the area's native mixed woodland, with wet and dry heath, grassland, and coastal ecosystems. As the biosphere designation was primarily concerned with the interaction between humans and the environment the economic uses of the wider area surrounding the NNR were also noted in the listing, these including the controlled grazing of beef cattle and sheep, forestry plantations, fishing (including creel fishing), and fish farming. It was noted that the area was popular with tourists, and harbours such as Crinan were used for commercial boat trips as well as pleasure cruises by private craft. Monitoring and research projects were a primary objective of the management plan for the biosphere reserve, as was education. A resource pack was issued to all local schools, and training was provided to primary school teachers, as well as land managers and workers.
