= Local Geodiversity Action Plan =

Localised geodiversity plan in the UK

In Great Britain, a Local Geodiversity Action Plan is a plan which sets out actions to conserve, enhance and promote the geodiversity of a particular area, usually based along local authority boundaries such as a county. For convenience both in speech and in the written word the term is often shortened to its acronym LGAP (and pronounced 'ell-gap'). The establishment of an LGAP typically follows the carrying out of a RIGS audit for the area concerned. RIGS are those localities within an area which have been determined to be 'regionally significant geodiversity sites' (this term is tending to replace the earlier, and somewhat clumsy, 'regionally significant geological and geomorphological sites'.

The plans are analogous to the Local Biodiversity Action Plans (or 'LBAPs') which have been created in respect of the fauna, flora and habitats of areas of England and Wales. The production of such plans is promoted and assisted by the statutory nature conservation bodies for England, Scotland and Wales, respectively Natural England, NatureScot and Natural Resources Wales. A similar approach is being taken by certain companies to prepare plans for their landholdings.

== Examples ==
By way of example, an LGAP was prepared for Cornwall and the Isles of Scilly by the Cornwall RIGS Group (now Cornwall Geoconservation Group, part of Cornwall Wildlife Trust) and another was in preparation for the Clwydian Hills AONB, before the AONB was extended to include the Dee Valley, whilst the 2019-21 LBAP for Edinburgh incorporates a very short (2 pages plus one Action - 1.3) LGAP.
