= Organic farming and biodiversity =

The effect of organic farming has been a subject of interest for researchers. Theory suggests that organic farming practices, which exclude the use of most synthetic pesticides and fertilizers, may be beneficial for biodiversity. This is generally shown to be true for soils scaled to the area of cultivated land, where species abundance is, on average, 30% richer than that of conventional farms. However, for crop yield-scaled land the effect of organic farming on biodiversity is highly debated due to the significantly lower yields compared to conventional farms.

In ancient farming practices, farmers did not possess the technology or manpower to have a significant impact on the destruction of biodiversity even as mass-production agriculture was rising. Nowadays, common farming methods generally rely on pesticides to maintain high yields. With such, most agricultural landscapes favor mono-culture crops with very little flora or fauna co-existence (van Elsen 2000). Modern organic farm practices such as the removal of pesticides and the inclusion of animal manure, crop rotation, and multi-cultural crops provide the chance for biodiversity to thrive.

== Impact of organic farming on biodiversity at landscape level ==
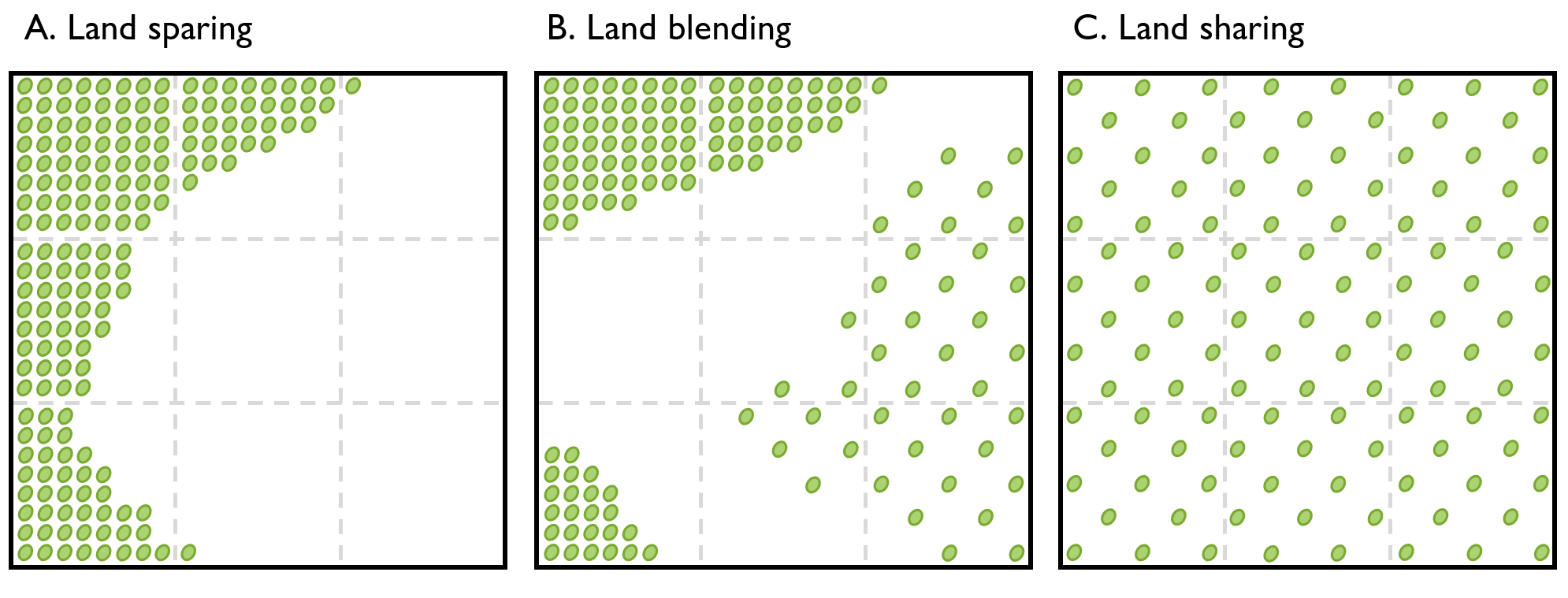
Schematic representation of the landscape management strategies considered in the land sharing vs. land sparing debate. Black frames represent landscapes and green shapes indicate biodiversity (i.e.nature elements).

The impact of organic agriculture on biodiversity is not limited to practices within individual plots but is better considered at landscape scale. This broader approach is particularly relevant for reconciling biodiversity conservation while maintaining sufficient agricultural production. In this context, two landscape management strategies are traditionally opposed: land sparing (which combines intensive farming and nature reserves) and land sharing via organic farming. A 2018 literature review of empirical studies indicates that land sparing is generally favored for conserving tropical forest biodiversity (67% of relevant studies).

Organic farming supports higher biodiversity than conventional farming, but at the cost of lower yields. A 2022 meta-analysis found that organic farming had on average a 23% increase in biodiversity with a similar reduction in yield. The authors also evaluated whether biodiversity gains outweigh yield losses at the landscape level and concluded that organic farming is advantageous when surrounding unfarmed land is less than 2.4 times as biodiverse as conventional farmland. However, semi-natural habitats and uncropped field margins often exceed this threshold, suggesting that conventional farming combined with land sparing may be preferable in many landscapes.

Hodgson et al. found that conventional farming combined with setting aside land as nature reserves is more beneficial for butterfly populations when the yield of organic farming falls below 87% of that of conventional farming.

A 2018 review article in the Annual Review of Resource Economics found that widespread upscaling of organic agriculture would cause additional loss of natural habitats because more land is needed due to lower yields in organic farming.

== Impact of organic farming on biodiversity at local level ==
=== Management practices ===
The conservation of natural resources and biodiversity is a core principle of organic production. Three broad management practices (prohibition/reduced use of chemical pesticides and inorganic fertilizers; sympathetic management of non-cropped habitats; and preservation of mixed farming) that are largely intrinsic (but not exclusive) to organic farming are particularly beneficial for farmland wildlife. Using practices that attract or introduce beneficial insects, provide habitat for birds and mammals, and provide conditions that increase soil biotic diversity serve to supply vital ecological services to organic production systems. Advantages to certified organic operations that implement these types of production practices include: 1) decreased dependence on outside fertility inputs; 2) reduced pest-management costs; 3) more reliable sources of clean water; and 4) better pollination.

=== Impact on species ===
Nearly all non-crop, naturally occurring species observed in comparative farm land practice studies show a preference in organic farming both by population and richness. Spanning all associated species, there is an average of 30% more on organic farms versus conventional farming methods, however this does not account for possible loss of biodiversity due to decreased yields. Birds, butterflies, soil microbes, beetles, earthworms, spiders, vegetation, and mammals are particularly affected. Some organic farms may use less pesticides and thus biodiversity fitness and population density may benefit. Larger farms however tend to use pesticides more liberally and in some cases to larger extent than conventional farms. Many weed species attract beneficial insects that improve soil qualities and forage on weed pests. Soil-bound organisms often benefit because of increased bacteria populations due to natural fertilizer spread such as manure, while experiencing reduced intake of herbicides and pesticides commonly associated with conventional farming methods. Increased biodiversity, especially from soil microbes such as mycorhizae, have been proposed as an explanation for the high yields experienced by some organic plots, especially in light of the differences seen in a 21-year comparison of organic and control fields.

==== Earthworms ====
Earthworm population and diversity appears to have the most significant data out of all studies. Out of six studies comparing earthworm biodiversity to organic and conventional farming methods, all six suggested a preference for organic practices including a study at the pioneering Haughley farm in 1980/1981 that compared earthworm populations and soil properties after 40 years. Hole et al. (2005) summarized a study conducted by Brown (1999) and found nearly double the population and diversity when comparing farming methods.

==== Birds ====
Organic farms are said to be beneficial to birds while remaining economical. Bird species are one of the most prominent animal groups that benefit from organic farming methods. Many species rely on farmland for foraging, feeding, and migration phases. With such, bird populations often relate directly to the natural quality of farmland. The more natural diversity of organic farms provides better habitats to bird species, and is especially beneficial when the farmland is located within a migration zone. In 5 recent studies almost all bird species including locally declining species, both population and variation increased on organic farmland,. Making a switch from conventional farming methods to organic practices also seems to directly improve bird species in the area. While organic farming improves bird populations and diversity, species populations receive the largest boost when organic groups are varied within a landscape. Bird populations are increased further with optimal habitat for biodiversity, rather than organic alone, with systems such as Conservation Grade.

==== Butterflies ====
A specific study done in the UK in 2006 found substantially more butterflies on organic farms versus standard farming methods except for two pest species. The study also observed higher populations in uncropped field margins compared with cropland edges regardless of farm practice. Conversely, Weibull et al. (2000) found no significant differences in species diversity or population.

==== Spiders ====
Ten studies have been conducted involving spider species and abundance on farm systems. All but three of the studies indicated that there was a higher diversity of spider species on organic farms, in addition to populations of species. Two of the studies indicated higher species diversity, but statistically insignificant populations between organic and standard farming methods.

==== Soil Microbes ====
Out of 13 studies comparing bacteria and fungus communities between organic and standard farming, 8 of the studies showed heightened level of growth on organic farm systems. One study concluded that the use of “green” fertilizers and manures was the primary cause of higher bacterial levels on organic farms. On the other hand, nematode population/diversity depended on what their primary food intake was. Bacteria-feeding nematodes showed preference towards organic systems whereas fungus-feeding nematodes showed preference for standard farm systems. The heightened level of bacteria-feeding nematodes makes sense due to higher levels of bacteria in organic soils, but the fungus-feeding populations being higher on standard farms seems to contradict the data since more fungi are generally found on organic farms.

==== Beetles ====
According to Hole et al. (2005), beetle species are among the most commonly studied animal species on farming systems. Twelve studies have found a higher population and species richness of carabids on organic systems. The overall conclusion of significantly higher carabid population species and diversity is that organic farms have a higher level of weed species where they can thrive. Staphylinid populations and diversity have seemed to show no specific preference with some studies showing higher population and diversity, some with lower population and diversity, and one study showed no statistical significance between the organic and conventional farming systems.

==== Mammals ====
Two comparative studies have been conducted involving mammal populations and diversity among farm practices. A study done by Brown (1999) found that small mammal population density and diversity did not depend on farming practices, however overall activity was higher on organic farms. It was concluded that more food resources were available to small mammals on organic farms because of the reduction or lack of herbicides and pesticides. Another study conducted by Wickramasinghe et al. (2003) compared bat species and activity. Species activity and foraging were both more than double on organic farms compared to conventional farms. Species richness was also higher on organic farms, and 2 of the sixteen species sighted were found only on organic farms.

==== Vegetation ====
Approximately ten studies have been conducted to compare non-crop vegetation between organic and conventional farming practices. Hedgerow, inner-crop and grassland observations were made within these studies and all but one showed a higher weed preference and diversity in or around organic farms. Most of these studies showed significant overall preference for organic farming preferences especially for broad-leafed species, but many grass species showed far less on conventional farms likely because pesticide interaction was low or non-existent. Organic farm weed population and richness was believed to be lower in mid-crop land because of weed-removal methods such as under sowing. Switching from conventional to organic farming often results in a “boom” of weed speciation due to intense chemical change of soil composition from the lack of herbicides and pesticides. Natural plant species can also vary on organic farms from year-to-year because crop rotation creates new competition based on the chemical needs of each crop.

=== Impact of increased biodiversity ===
The level of biodiversity that can be yielded from organic farming provides a natural capital to humans. Species found in most organic farms provides a means of agricultural sustainability by reducing amount of human input (e.g. fertilizers, pesticides). Farmers that produce with organic methods reduce risk of poor yields by promoting biodiversity. Common game birds such as the ring-necked pheasant and the northern bobwhite often reside in agriculture landscapes, and are a natural capital yielded from high demands of recreational hunting. Because bird species richness and population are typically higher on organic farm systems, promoting biodiversity can be seen as logical and economical.

Biological research on soil and soil organisms has proven beneficial to the system of organic farming. Varieties of bacteria and fungi break down chemicals, plant matter and animal waste into productive soil nutrients. In turn, the producer benefits by healthier yields and more arable soil for future crops. Furthermore, a 21-year study was conducted testing the effects of organic soil matter and its relationship to soil quality and yield. Controls included actively managed soil with varying levels of manure, compared to a plot with no manure input. After the study commenced, there was significantly lower yields on the control plot when compared to the fields with manure. The concluded reason was an increased soil microbe community in the manure fields, providing a healthier, more arable soil system.

== Detriments to biodiversity through organic farming ==
Organic farming practices still require active participation from the farmer to effectively boost biodiversity. Making a switch to organic farming methods does not automatically guarantee improved biodiversity. Pro-conservation ethics are required to create arable farm land that generates biodiversity. Conservationist ideals are commonly overlooked because they require additional physical and economical efforts from the producer. Common weed-removal processes like undercutting and controlled burning provides little opportunity for species survival, and often leads to comparable populations and richness to conventionally managed landscapes when performed in excess. Another common process is the addition of biotopes in the form of hedgerows and ponds to further improve species richness. Farmers commonly make the mistake of over-using these resources for more intense crop production because organic yields are typically lower. Another error comes from the over-stratification of biotopes. A series of small clusters does not provide adequate land area for high biodiversity potential.

== USDA guidelines ==
The USDA's Agricultural Marketing Service published a Federal Register notice on 15 January 2016, announcing the National Organic Program (NOP) final guidance on Natural Resources and Biodiversity Conservation for Certified Organic Operations. Given the broad scope of natural resources which includes soil, water, wetland, woodland and wildlife, the guidance provides examples of practices that support the underlying conservation principles and demonstrate compliance with USDA organic regulations § 205.200. The final guidance provides organic certifiers and farms with examples of production practices that support conservation principles and comply with the USDA organic regulations, which require operations to maintain or improve natural resources. The final guidance also clarifies the role of certified operations (to submit an OSP to a certifier), certifiers (ensure that the OSP describes or lists practices that explain the operator's monitoring plan and practices to support natural resources and biodiversity conservation), and inspectors (onsite inspection) in the implementation and verification of these production practices.
