= BioWeb =

The BioWeb is the connotation for a network of web-enabled biological devices (e.g. trees, plants, and flowers) which extends an internet of things to the Internet of Living Things of natural sensory devices. The BioWeb devices give insights to real-time ecological data and feedback to changes in the environment. The biodiversity of today is one giant ecological mesh network of information exchange, and a resource humanity should be able to access for a better understanding of the state of our global ecology.

== Technology ==
The BioWeb information technologies emerge from the interdisciplinary fields of biotechnology and nanotechnology. The devices for reading individual ecological systems can be either Wireless transmitters implemented into the organic structure of seeds or external inserted network nodes with the ability to read information and wirelessly transmit the information to the Internet (or network).

== See also ==
- Mesh networking, a way to route information between nodes
- Biotechnology, technology based on biology where technology is a concept that deals with knowledge of skills
