= Ecosystem diversity =

Diversity and variations in ecosystems

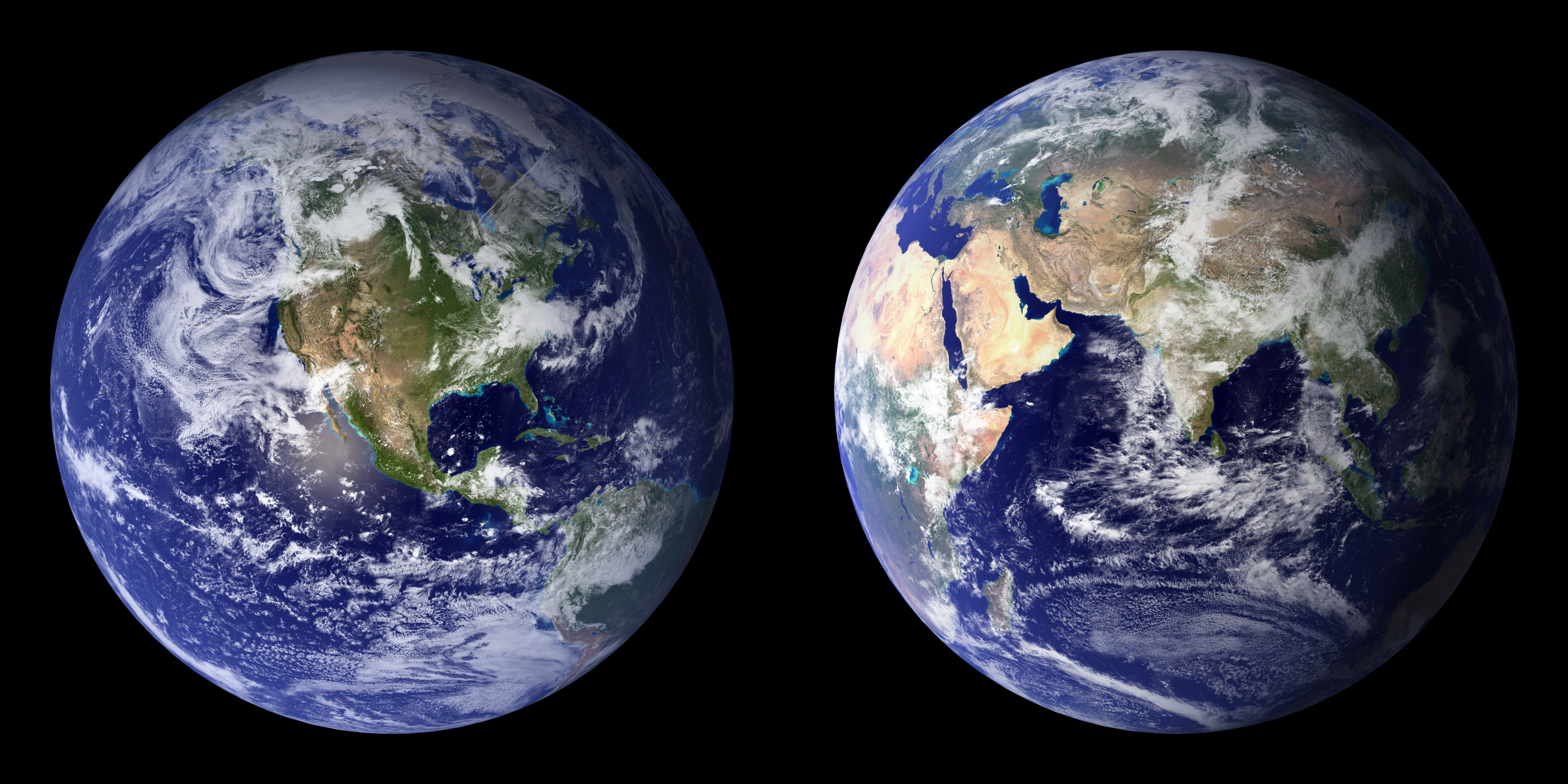
The Earth has many diverse ecosystems and ecologicalsystem diversity. These are NASA composite images of the Earth: 2001 (left), 2002 (right), titled The Blue Marble.

Ecosystem diversity deals with the variations in ecosystems within a geographical location and its overall impact on human existence and the environment.

Ecosystem diversity addresses the combined characteristics of biotic properties which are living organisms (biodiversity) and abiotic properties such as nonliving things like water or soil (geodiversity). It is a variation in the ecosystems found in a region or the variation in ecosystems over the whole planet. Ecological diversity includes the variation in both terrestrial and aquatic ecosystems. Ecological diversity can also take into account the variation in the complexity of a biological community, including the number of different niches, the number of and other ecological processes. An example of ecological diversity on a global scale would be the variation in ecosystems, such as deserts, forests, grasslands, wetlands and oceans. Ecological diversity is the largest scale of biodiversity, and within each ecosystem, there is a great deal of both species and genetic diversity.

== Impact ==
Diversity in the ecosystem is significant to human existence for a variety of reasons. Ecosystem diversity boosts the availability of oxygen via the process of photosynthesis amongst plant organisms domiciled in the habitat. Diversity in an aquatic environment helps in the purification of water by plant varieties for use by humans. Diversity increases plant varieties which serve as a good source for medicines and herbs for human use. A lack of diversity in the ecosystem produces an opposite result.

== Examples ==
Some examples of ecosystems that are rich in diversity are:

- Deserts
- Forests
- Large marine ecosystems
- Marine ecosystems
- Old-growth forests
- Rainforests
- Tundra
- Coral reefs
- Marine

== Ecosystem diversity as a result of evolutionary pressure ==
Ecological diversity around the world can be directly linked to the evolutionary and selective pressures that constrain the diversity outcome of the ecosystems within different niches. Tundras, Rainforests, coral reefs and deciduous forests all are formed as a result of evolutionary pressures. Even seemingly small evolutionary interactions can have large impacts on the diversity of the ecosystems throughout the world. One of the best studied cases of this is of the honeybee's interaction with angiosperms on every continent in the world except Antarctica.

In 2010, Robert Brodschneider and Karl Crailsheim conducted a study on the health and nutrition in honeybee colonies. The study focused on overall colony health, adult nutrition, and larva nutrition as a function of the effect of pesticides, monocultures and genetically modified crops to see if the anthropogenically created problems can have an effect pollination levels. The results indicate that human activity does have a role in the destruction of the fitness of the bee colony. The extinction or near extinction of these pollinators would result in many plants that feed humans on a wide scale needing alternative pollination methods. Crop pollinating insects are worth annually $14.6 billion to the US economy and the cost to hand pollinate over insect pollination is estimated to cost $5,715-$7,135 more per hectare. Not only will there be a cost increase but also a decrease in colony fitness, leading to a decrease in genetic diversity, which studies have shown has a direct link to the long-term survival of the honeybee colonies.

According to a study, there are over 50 plants that are dependent on bee pollination, many of these being key staples to feeding the world. Another study conducted states that a lack of plant diversity will lead to a decline in the bee population fitness, and a low bee colony fitness has impacts on the fitness of plant ecosystem diversity. By allowing for bee pollination and working to reduce anthropogenically harmful footprints, bee pollination can increase genetic diversity of flora growth and create a unique ecosystem that is highly diverse and can provide a habitat and niche for many other organisms to thrive. Due to the evolutionary pressures of bees being located on six out of seven continents, there can be no denying the impact of pollinators on the ecosystem diversity. The pollen collected by the bees is harvested and used as an energy source for wintertime; this act of collecting pollen from local plants also has a more important effect of facilitating the movement of genes between organisms.

The new evolutionary pressures that are largely anthropogenically catalyzed can potentially cause widespread collapse of ecosystems. In the North Atlantic Sea, a study was conducted that followed the effects of the human interaction on surrounding ocean habitats. They found that there was no habitat or trophic level that in some way was affected negatively by human interaction, and that much of the diversity of life was being stunted as a result.

== See also ==
- Bioregion
- Disparity (ecology)
- Ecology
- Evolutionary biology
- Genetic diversity
- Nature
- Natural environment
- Species diversity
- Sustainable development
