= Diversity–function debate =

Functional diversity, composition, and species richness affect the biogeochemical processes of ecosystems. However, the degree to which these factors influence ecosystems and whether that influence is significant is debated.

== Initial conception and findings ==
In the article The Influence of Functional Diversity and Composition on Ecosystem Processes, scientists reported on an experiment in which they studied the effects of plant species diversity, functional diversity, and functional composition on ecosystem processes, as measured in six response variables (productivity, plant % N, plant tot. N, soil NH4, soil NO3, and light penetration). 289 plots were designed with varying amounts of the three controlled factors. Each plot contained up to 32 perennial grassland-grassland species representing up to five plant functional groups. These species were not equal in their functional impact on the ecosystem.

The statistical results show that functional diversity and species composition significantly affected the six response variables to a greater extent than species diversity. By themselves, all three factors significantly affected ecosystem processes and also influenced each other. The mechanisms and degree by which they influenced each other are unclear. The Tilman article doesn't purport to have the definitive answer. Uncertainty is implied in the major conclusions of the paper: "...the number of functionally different roles represented in an ecosystem may be a stronger determinant of ecosystem processes than the total number of species, per se. However, species diversity and functional diversity are correlated..." This study implies that to progress, scientists on both sides of the diversity–function debate must develop a holistic model that acknowledges the inextricable relationship between diversity and function.

== Debate ==
In the fourth installment of the Ecological Society of America's Issues in Ecology series, the David Tilman et al. study was used to support the argument for a positive correlation between diversity and productivity. Following its release, the Issues authors were accused of being deliberately misleading, presenting controversial findings as fact. Wardle charged that the diversity experiments reported in Tilman et al., despite being stated in "Issues" as solid fact, were confounded by an experimental design that assumed "that biological communities are randomly assembled with regard to the ecosystem property being investigated." This phenomenon is termed the "selection probability effect." The Issues article, however, does not present this opinion as fact. It discusses the sampling effect as a possible mechanism, not as an irrefutable mechanism. Furthermore, its conclusions are marked by uncertainty: although species diversity and functional diversity are correlated, functional diversity may play a larger role in ecosystem processes than the total number of species.

Some of the services provided by ecosystems include the components used in fabricating food, clothing, medicine, and energy production. Recreation and passive ecosystem services are significant as well. These include fishing, hunting, hiking, birding, camping, water filtration/purification, climate moderation, flood mitigation, erosion prevention, and pest management.

As reported in Expert Estimates About Effects of Biodiversity on Ecosystem Processes and Services, ecosystem process rates correlate strongly with biodiversity, and these processes are crucial for ecosystem services.

== See also ==
- Ecological effects of biodiversity
