= Guild (ecology) =

Group of sympatric species with similar ecological function

A guild (or ecological guild) is any group of species that exploit the same resources, or that exploit different resources in related ways. It is not necessary that the species within a guild occupy the same, or even similar, ecological niches. (Note: An ecological niche is defined as the role an organism plays in its community, i.e. decomposer, primary producer, etc.)

== Details ==
Guilds are defined according to the locations, attributes, or activities of their component species. For example, the mode of acquiring nutrients, the mobility, and the habitat zones that the species occupy or exploit can be used to define a guild. The number of guilds occupying an ecosystem is termed its disparity. Members of a guild within a given ecosystem could be competing for resources, such as space or light, while cooperating in resisting wind stresses, attracting pollinators, or detecting predators, such as happens among savannah-dwelling antelope and zebra.

A guild does not typically have strict, or even clearly defined boundaries, nor does it need to be taxonomically cohesive. A broadly defined guild will almost always have constituent guilds; for example, grazing guilds will have some species that concentrate on coarse, plentiful forage, while others concentrate on low-growing, finer plants. Each of those two sub-guilds may be regarded as guilds in appropriate contexts, and they might, in turn, have sub-guilds in more closely selective contexts. Some authorities even speak of guilds in terms of a fractal resource model. This concept arises in several related contexts, such as the metabolic theory of ecology, the scaling pattern of occupancy, and spatial analysis in ecology, all of which are fundamental concepts in defining guilds.

An ecological guild is not to be confused with a taxocene, a group of phylogenetically related organisms in a community that do not necessarily share the same or similar niches (for example, "the insect community"). Nor is a guild the same as a trophic species, which is a functional group of taxa sharing the same set of predators and prey within a food web.

=== Microbial guilds ===
Some authors have used the term guild to analyze microbial communities. However, precisely because of the pointed lack of concretion in the original definition, it has been used with different connotations. Recently, some effort has been made to address this issue. Some authors have proposed a formal definition for guilds that avoids this inherent ambiguity of niche exploitation, and a quantification method considering the problems arising from degeneracy in protein functions. According to the authors, any organism that performs a function, regardless of its phylogenetic lineage, its environmental preferences or how it carries it out, would be regarded as a representative member of the guild. This contrasts with the definitions used for the study of macro organisms, where membership demanded that the different forms of exploitation of the resource were related or similar.

=== Alpha vs Beta guilds ===
The term guild is a broad term to describe the relationship between different species using the same resource. Since it is difficult to classify a guild it can be broken down into two more specific categories, alpha guilds and beta guilds.

Alpha guild is specifically related to species that share a resource used within the same community. Species in an alpha guild do not typically coexist in the same area, as the competitive exclusion principle prevents this. If species are grouped into an alpha guild together one of them will need to change the way they use this resource or change the resources they use to survive.

Beta guild is specifically related to species that are found in the same environmental conditions. Species in a beta guild are typically found in the same space and time together, as their environmental range is the same. Species grouped into the same beta guild still may use the same resources but not competitively.

== Example guilds ==
- Browsers and terrestrial folivores
- Forest canopy folivores
- Forest floor scavengers
- Grazers
- Forbs
- Graminoids (grasses, rushes and sedges)
- Plankton
- Saprophytes
- Shrubs
- Trees
- Vines
- Piscivores

== See also ==
- Functional group (ecology)
