= Ecological effects of biodiversity =

The diversity of species and genes in ecological communities affects the functioning of these communities. These ecological effects of biodiversity in turn are affected by both climate change through enhanced greenhouse gases, aerosols and loss of land cover, and biological diversity, causing a rapid loss of biodiversity and extinctions of species and local populations. The current rate of extinction is sometimes considered a mass extinction, with current species extinction rates on the order of 100 to 1000 times as high as in the past.

The two main areas where the effect of biodiversity on ecosystem function have been studied are the relationship between diversity and productivity, and the relationship between diversity and community stability. More biologically diverse communities appear to be more productive (in terms of biomass production) than are less diverse communities, and they appear to be more stable in the face of perturbations.

Also animals that inhabit an area may alter the surviving conditions by factors assimilated by climate.

== Definitions ==
In order to understand the effects that changes in biodiversity will have on ecosystem functioning, it is important to define some terms. Biodiversity is not easily defined, but may be thought of as the number and/or evenness of genes, species, and ecosystems in a region. This definition includes genetic diversity, or the diversity of genes within a species, species diversity, or the diversity of species within a habitat or region, and ecosystem diversity, or the diversity of habitats within a region.

Two things commonly measured in relation to changes in diversity are productivity and stability. Productivity is a measure of ecosystem function. It is generally measured by taking the total aboveground biomass of all plants in an area. Many assume that it can be used as a general indicator of ecosystem function and that total resource use and other indicators of ecosystem function are correlated with productivity.

Stability is much more difficult to define, but can be generally thought of in two ways. General stability of a population is a measure that assumes stability is higher if there is less of a chance of extinction. This kind of stability is generally measured by measuring the variability of aggregate community properties, like total biomass, over time. The other definition of stability is a measure of resilience and resistance, where an ecosystem that returns quickly to an equilibrium after a perturbation or resists invasion is thought of as more stable than one that does not.

== Productivity and stability as indicators of ecosystem health ==
The importance of stability in community ecology is clear. An unstable ecosystem will be more likely to lose species. Thus, if there is indeed a link between diversity and stability, it is likely that losses of diversity could feedback on themselves, causing even more losses of species. Productivity, on the other hand, has a less clear importance in community ecology. In managed areas like cropland, and in areas where animals are grown or caught, increasing productivity increases the economic success of the area and implies that the area has become more efficient, leading to possible long term resource sustainability. It is more difficult to find the importance of productivity in natural ecosystems.

Beyond the value biodiversity has in regulating and stabilizing ecosystem processes, there are direct economic consequences of losing diversity in certain ecosystems and in the world as a whole. Losing species means losing potential foods, medicines, industrial products, and tourism, all of which have a direct economic effect on peoples lives.

== Effects on community productivity ==
- Complementarity Plant species coexistence is thought to be the result of niche partitioning, or differences in resource requirements among species. By complementarity, a more diverse plant community should be able to use resources more completely, and thus be more productive. Also called niche differentiation, this mechanism is a central principle in the functional group approach, which breaks species diversity down into functional components.
- Facilitation Facilitation is a mechanism whereby certain species help or allow other species to grow by modifying the environment in a way that is favorable to a co-occurring species. Plants can interact through an intermediary like nitrogen, water, temperature, space, or interactions with weeds or herbivores among others. Some examples of facilitation include large desert perennials acting as nurse plants, aiding the establishment of young neighbors of other species by alleviating water and temperature stress, and nutrient enrichment by nitrogen-fixers such as legumes.
- The Sampling Effect The sampling effect of diversity can be thought of as having a greater chance of including a species of greatest inherent productivity in a plot that is more diverse. This provides for a composition effect on productivity, rather than diversity being a direct cause. However, the sampling effect may in fact be a compilation of different effects. The sampling effect can be separated into the greater likelihood of selecting a species that is 1) adapted well to particular site conditions, or 2) of a greater inherent productivity. Additionally, one can add to the sampling effect a greater likelihood of including 3) a pair of species that highly complement each other, or 4) a certain species with a large facilitative effect on other members of the community.

=== Review of data ===
Field experiments to test the degree to which diversity affects community productivity have had variable results, but many long-term studies in grassland ecosystems have found that diversity does indeed enhance the productivity of ecosystems. Additionally, evidence of this relationship has also been found in grassland microcosms. The differing results between studies may partially be attributable to their reliance on samples with equal species diversities rather than species diversities that mirror those observed in the environment. A 2006 experiment utilizing a realistic variation in species composition for its grassland samples found a positive correlation between increased diversity and increased production.

However, these studies have come to different conclusions as to whether the cause was due more to diversity or to species composition. Specifically, a diversity in the functional roles of the species may be a more important quality for predicting productivity than the diversity in species number. Recent mathematical models have highlighted the importance of ecological context in unraveling this problem. Some models have indicated the importance of disturbance rates and spatial heterogeneity of the environment, others have indicated that the time since disturbance and the habitat's carrying capacity can cause differing relationships. Each ecological context should yield not only a different relationship, but a different contribution to the relationship due to diversity and to composition. The current consensus holds at least that certain combinations of species provide increased community productivity.

=== Future research ===
In order to correctly identify the consequences of diversity on productivity and other ecosystem processes, many things must happen. First, it is imperative that scientists stop looking for a single relationship. It is obvious now from the models, the data, and the theory that there is no one overarching effect of diversity on productivity. Scientists must try to quantify the differences between composition effect and diversity effects, as many experiments never quantify the final realized species diversity (instead only counting numbers of species of seeds planted) and confound a sampling effect for facilitators (a compositional factor) with diversity effects.

Relative amounts of overyielding (or how much more a species grows when grown with other species than it does in monoculture) should be used rather than absolute amounts as relative overyielding can give clues as to the mechanism by which diversity is influencing productivity, however if experimental protocols are incomplete, one may be able to indicate the existence of a complementary or facilitative effect in the experiment, but not be able to recognize its cause. Experimenters should know what the goal of their experiment is, that is, whether it is meant to inform natural or managed ecosystems, as the sampling effect may only be a real effect of diversity in natural ecosystems (managed ecosystems are composed to maximize complementarity and facilitation regardless of species number). By knowing this, they should be able to choose spatial and temporal scales that are appropriate for their experiment. Lastly, to resolve the diversity-function debate, it is advisable that experiments be done with large amounts of spatial and resource heterogeneity and environmental fluctuation over time, as these types of experiments should be able to demonstrate the diversity-function relationship more easily.

== Effects on community stability ==
- Averaging Effect If all species have differential responses to changes in the ecosystem over time, then the averaging of these responses will cause a more temporally stable ecosystem if more species are in the ecosystem. This effect is a statistical effect due to summing random variables.
- Negative Covariance Effect If some species do better when other species are not doing well, then when there are more species in the ecosystem, their overall variance will be lower than if there were fewer species in the system. This lower variance indicates higher stability. This effect is a consequence of competition as highly competitive species will negatively covary.
- Insurance Effect If an ecosystem contains more species then it will have a greater likelihood of having redundant stabilizing species, and it will have a greater number of species that respond to perturbations in different ways. This will enhance an ecosystem's ability to buffer perturbations.
- Resistance to Invasion Diverse communities may use resources more completely than simple communities because of a diversity effect for complementarity. Thus invaders may have reduced success in diverse ecosystems, or there may be a reduced likelihood that an invading species will introduce a new property or process to a diverse ecosystem.
- Resistance to Disease A decreased number of competing plant species may allow the abundances of other species to increase, facilitating the spread of diseases of those species.

=== Review of temporal stability data ===
Models have predicted that empirical relationships between temporal variation of community productivity and species diversity are indeed real, and that they almost have to be. Some temporal stability data can be almost completely explained by the averaging effect by constructing null models to test the data against. Competition, which causes negative covariances, only serves to strengthen these relationships.

=== Review of resistance and resilience stability data ===
This area is more contentious than the area of temporal stability, mostly because some have tried generalizing the findings of the temporal stability models and theory to stability in general. While the relationship between temporal variations in productivity and diversity has a mathematical cause, which will allow the relationship to be seen much more often than not, it is not the case with resistance/resilience stability. Some experimenters have seen a correlation between diversity and reduced invasibility, though many have also seen the opposite. The correlation between diversity and disease is also tenuous, though theory and data do seem to support it.

=== Future research ===
In order to more fully understand the effects of diversity on the temporal stability of ecosystems it is necessary to recognize that they are bound to occur. By constructing null models to test the data against (as in Doak et al. 1998) it becomes possible to find situations and ecological contexts where ecosystems become more or less stable than they should be. Finding these contexts would allow for mechanistic studies into why these ecosystems are more stable, which may allow for applications in conservation management.

More importantly more complete experiments into whether diverse ecosystems actually resist invasion and disease better than their less diverse equivalents as invasion and disease are two important factors that lead to species extinctions in the present day. In order to address these problems specifically, future work should focus on practical methods to increase the successful establishment of the poor performing but desirable species.

== Theory and preliminary effects from examining food webs ==
One major problem with both the diversity-productivity and diversity-stability debates discussed up to this point is that both focus on interactions at just a single trophic level. That is, they are concerned with only one level of the food web, namely plants. Other research, unconcerned with the effects of diversity, has demonstrated strong top-down forcing of ecosystems (see keystone species). There is very little actual data available regarding the effects of different food webs, but theory helps us in this area. First, if a food web in an ecosystem has a lot of weak interactions between different species, then it should have more stable populations and the community as a whole should be more stable. If upper levels of the web are more diverse, then there will be less biomass in the lower levels and if lower levels are more diverse they will better be able to resist consumption and be more stable in the face of consumption. Also, top-down forcing should be reduced in less diverse ecosystems because of the bias for species in higher trophic levels to go extinct first. Lastly, it has recently been shown that consumers can dramatically change the biodiversity-productivity-stability relationships that are implied by plants alone. Thus, it will be important in the future to incorporate food web theory into the future study of the effects of biodiversity. In addition this complexity will need to be addressed when designing biodiversity management plans.

== See also ==
- Biodiversity
- Ecosystem services
- Diversity-function debate
- Association (ecology)
