= Inter-American Biodiversity Information Network =

Network

The Inter-American Biodiversity Information Network (IABIN) is a network dedicated to the adoption and promotion of ecoinformatics standards and protocols in all the countries of the Americas, thus facilitating the sound use of biological information for conservation and sustainable use of biodiversity. It is primarily an inter-governmental initiative but has a strong participation of a wide range of non-governmental partners.

The creation of IABIN in 1996 was mandated by the Heads of State at the Santa Cruz Summit of the Americas meeting in Bolivia. The Summit requested the Organization of American States (OAS) to act as the diplomatic host of the network.

Partnerships with similar or related initiatives is a critical part of the network’s strategy, so that existing standards or protocols can be promoted and not reinvented. For example, the Global Biodiversity Information Facility (GBIF) is leading the world in the development of specimen data standards, which IABIN is promoting. Strong relationships are also being developed with national environmental information organizations which are often very active and better placed to promote national programs, such as the National Biological Information Infrastructure (NBII) in the United States or the Instituto Nacional de Biodiversidad (INBio) of Costa Rica.

== Governance ==
IABIN is a network in which the countries of the Americas as well as diverse governmental and civil society organizations participate. The highest governing body of the network is the IABIN Council, which meets about every year. Each participating country can send a representative, their “Focal Point”, to the Council, which defines the strategies and policies of the network. In practice, decisions are made by consensus and include a strong participation of non-governmental actors such as major non-governmental organizations (NGOs).

At present, 34 countries have designated IABIN Focal Points. Most countries have designated their Clearing House Mechanism National Focal Point as their IABIN Focal Point as well. The Focal Points in each country are responsible for both representing their country’s views in the adoption of IABIN decisions and policies and then promoting them in their country.

Between Council meetings, in order to guide effectively the operations of IABIN, a smaller governance body has been created. The IABIN Executive Committee (IEC) comprises representatives of eight countries and two international governmental organizations or non-governmental organization (IGO/NGO) members, currently GBIF (Global Biodiversity Information Facility) and TNC (The Nature Conservancy). The IEC members are elected for fixed terms at each Council meeting. The current members of the IEC are:

- Gladys Cotter (Chairperson) - United States
- Karin Molt (Vice-Chairperson) - Chile
- Dionne Newell - Jamaica
- Ana Aber - Uruguay
- Edgar Selvín Pérez - Guatemala
- Jocelyn Paul/Rickie Morain - Grenada
- Marina Hernández - Dominican Republic
- Dario Luque - Panama
- Beatriz Torres - Global Biodiversity Information Facility
- Maarten Kappelle - The Nature Conservancy

== Focus ==
The network has existed in name since 1996 and in its early years, several critical Council meetings were held (in Brasília, Brazil, and in Miami, USA) which defined the general structure and proposed functions of IABIN. In the initial years however, no Secretariat existed and the network benefited only from a number of small ad hoc investments, primarily from the United States, the World Bank, and the OAS.

In 2004, a major six-year investment began financed by the Global Environment Facility (GEF) (see below). Under this project, the network has developed its current foci of activities. These are the adoption of ecoinformatics standards and protocols, development of a catalogue and search tools (being done in coordination with NBII), creation of partnerships, creation and maintenance of the Secretariat, data creation grants, the operation of the “Thematic Networks”, and the creation of information tools for decision-makers.

The Thematic Networks, or TNs, are intended to lead the development of theme-specific standards and protocols and in the maintenance of hemisphere-wide networks of specialists and specialized institutions. In each case a Coordinating Institution has signed a memorandum of understanding with the IEC to lead the work of the TN. They are also tasked with development of search tools and linking of data in their thematic area with data of the other TNs. The TNs, with the coordinating institution in parentheses, are: Species and Specimens (INBio, Costa Rica), Ecosystems (NatureServe, USA), Protected Areas (UNEP-WCMC, UK), Invasive Species I3N Network (United States Geological Survey, USA), and Pollinators (CoEvolution Institute, USA).

== Supporting projects ==
The IABIN web site provides detailed information on a variety of projects and funding sources that are supporting the network and that are now coming on-line. These include investments of the United States, the World Bank, and the Gordon E. and Betty I. Moore Foundation. However, for the period of 2004-2010, a large GEF project has played a particularly important role in jumpstarting the network and implementing its strategies and priorities.

The source of the funds for the project is the Global Environment Facility (GEF) with the funds managed by the World Bank. The executing agency of the project, on behalf of the GEF-eligible countries of the Americas, is the OAS. The project includes US$6 million of grant funding from the GEF with almost $30 million of cofinancing provided by participating governments and other partners.
