= Taxocene =

A taxocene (from Greek τάξις and κοινός) is a taxonomically related set of species within a community. An example of a taxocene would be "fishes in a pond," as the fishes are closely related to one another (i.e., the fishes are more closely related, by evolutionary descent, to each other than any fish is related to any other type of pond organism) and fulfill similar roles within the pond community. Alternatively, it can be defined as a group of species that belong to particular supraspecific taxon and occur together in the same association.
