= National Biological Information Infrastructure =

- Website: www.nbii.gov

The National Biological Information Infrastructure (NBII) was a program coordinated by the United States Geological Survey's Biological Informatics Office within the USGS Biological Resources Discipline. Its purpose was to facilitate access to data and information on the biological resources of the United States, utilizing government agencies, academic institutions, non-government organizations, and private industry. It was terminated 15 January 2012.

The NBII coordinated the research output of the biological community into information systems that were easily accessed, by providing organization and a structure that was based on standards. The structure was essentially invisible to the end user of the information, but was vitally important to those wishing to participate by making data available through the system, or those who wished to become partners in the development of new tools, models, and applications. The end-user aspect of the NBII was its Web portal which provided access to information, publications, and data from the various data sources "in a seamless, unified portal."

== History ==
The NBII was an outgrowth of a 1993 National Research Council report titled "A Biological Survey for the Nation", which recommended that the United States Department of the Interior oversee the development of a National Biotic Resource Information System to coordinate information about biodiversity and ecosystems. The report found that such information was "vital to a wide range of scientific, educational, and government uses," but that, unfortunately, most of the information existed in forms that were not easily used. It envisioned a system of distributed databases designed to make the existing information more accessible. The report also suggested that new ways to collect and distribute data and information should be developed. It did mention networking, but not the Internet. .

As a first step, in 1994, President Clinton signed Executive Order 12906, "Coordinating Geographic Data Acquisition and Access: the National Spatial Data Infrastructure". National Spatial Data Infrastructure (NSDI) dealt with the acquisition, processing, storage, and distribution of geospatial (geographically referenced) data. In conjunction with this, but without a presidential order, former Secretary of the Interior Bruce Babbitt renamed the national biotic resource information system as the National Biological Information Infrastructure (NBII). In 1996 the Office of Management and Budget Circular A-130, the document which directs the management of federal information resources in the United States, was amended to include the NBII.

Funding and support for the NBII did not develop as quickly as the scientific community hoped, and in 1998, the President's Committee of Advisors on Science and Technology released a report "Teaming With Life: Investing in Science to Understand and Use America's Living Capital" which urged that current information technology be applied to the management of science information, and reiterated the findings of the 1993 report. In 2001 money was finally appropriated for the development of the system of NBII networked nodes, though far below the level recommended in the report.

In implementing this system, the USGS designed each aspect of the system to focus on a narrow scope (often geographic) or purpose. For example, the Southwest Information Node focused on desert ecosystems.

== International Initiatives ==
The NBII was involved with a range of international initiatives including:

1. "Global Biodiversity Information Facility" (GBIF)
2. "Inter-American Biodiversity Information Network" (IABIN)
3. "Invasive Species Information Network for the Americas" (I3N)
4. "Pollinators Thematic Network: A Network for Pollinator Information and Expertise in the Western Hemisphere" (PTN), primarily an IABIN initiative.
5. "Global Invasive Species Information Network"
6. "FishBase for the Americas: Improving Access to Western Hemisphere Fisheries" is a partnership of FishBase, the Inter-American Biodiversity Information Network (IABIN) and the NBII Fisheries and Aquatic Resources (FAR) Node.

== Reviews ==
Early on researchers found the NBII coordination less than expected. The NBII navigation buttons on the Invasive Species databases had confusing topic labels especially when compared with the National Agricultural Library labels. The switching back and forth between the portal and the databases was "a tedious exercise indeed." Nonetheless, the Federation of Government Information Processing Councils awarded the NBII a 2002 Award for Outstanding Intergovernmental Technology Solutions.

Due to the extensive amount and array of resources and data available, users often needed to both browse and search to locate specific information of interest. "A great deal of persistence may be required to find a particular database. Some valuable resources are found four or five layers into the site's hierarchy." An example of this excessive hierarchy was FRAMES, the "Fire Research And Management Exchange System" portal to U.S.-based Internet resources on forest and wildland fires. Other problems included resources that were listed well down on a long page, so that they did not appear on the screen, and there were the occasional dead links. "

== Termination and storage ==
In the President's Budget for Fiscal Year (FY) 2012, the NBII was identified as one of over 200 programs slated for termination or reduction. The FY 2011 Continuing Resolution for USGS, finalized in May 2011, accelerated the beginning of the termination activities to FY 2011 with their completion in FY 2012.

On October 3, 2011, USGS announced on all NBII websites and applications that on 15 January 2012, the NBII website and any applications residing on the nbii.gov domain would be shut down, and it was. Before that shutdown, the Library of Congress, Internet Archive and Stanford Libraries all independently harvested the data from the NBII Website. Stanford Libraries harvested the site twice between January 5 and January 13, 2012 for storage in its Fugitive US Agencies collection.

Data and metadata from the Mid Atlantic Information Node (MAIN), Fisheries and Aquatic Resources Node (FAR), and the Bird Node which were hosted by Penn State University (https://www.nacse.org/home/news/2009/2009july/NBII_Summer_09.pdf) were harvested and the information made available through the Data Commons (http://www.datacommons.psu.edu/) at Penn State.
