= Functional group (ecology) =

A functional group is a collection of organisms that share characteristics within a community. Ideally, these would perform equivalent tasks based on domain forces, rather than a common ancestor or evolutionary relationship. This could potentially lead to analogous structures that override the possibility of homology. More specifically, these beings produce resembling effects to external factors of an inhabiting system. Due to the fact that a majority of these creatures share an ecological niche, it is practical to assume they require similar structures in order to achieve the greatest amount of fitness. This refers to such as the ability to successfully reproduce to create offspring, and furthermore sustain life by avoiding predators and sharing meals.

== Scientific investigation ==
Rather than being based in theory, functional groups are directly observed and determined by research specialists. It is important that this information is witnessed firsthand in order to state as usable evidence. Behavior and overall contribution to others are common key points to look for. Individuals use the corresponding perceived traits to further link genetic profiles to one another. Although the species themselves are different, variables based on overall function and performance are interchangeable. These groups share an indistinguishable part within their energy flow, providing a key position within food chains and relationships within environment(s).

An ecosystem is the biological organization that defines and expands on various environment factors, abiotic and biotic, that relate to simultaneous interaction. Whether it be a producer or relative consumer, each and every piece of life maintains a critical position in the ongoing survival rates of its own surroundings. As it pertains, a functional group shares a very specific role within any given ecosystem and the process of cycling vitality.

== Categories ==
There are generally two types of functional groups that range between flora and specific animal populations. Groups that relate to vegetation science, or flora, are known as plant functional types. Also referred to as PFT for short, these often share identical photosynthetic processes and require comparable nutrients. As an example, plants that undergo photosynthesis share an identical purpose in producing chemical energy for others. In contrast, those within the animal science range are called guilds typically sharing feeding types. This could be easily simplified when viewing trophic levels. Examples include primary consumers, secondary consumers, tertiary consumers, and quaternary consumers.

== Diversity ==
Functional diversity is often referred to as the "value and the range of those species and organismal traits that influence ecosystem functioning". Traits of an organism that make it unique may include the way it moves, gathers resources, or reproduces, or the time of year it is active add to the overall diversity of an entire ecosystem, and therefore enhance the overall function, or productivity, of that ecosystem. Functional diversity increases the overall productivity of an ecosystem by allowing for an increase in niche occupation. Species have evolved to be more diverse through each epoch of time, with plants and insects having some of the most diverse families discovered thus far. The unique traits of an organism can allow a new niche to be occupied, allow for better defense against predators, and potentially lead to specialization. Organismal level functional diversity, which adds to the overall functional diversity of an ecosystem, is important for conservation efforts, especially in systems used for human consumption. Functional diversity can be difficult to measure accurately, but when done correctly, it provides useful insight to the overall function and stability of an ecosystem.

== Redundancy ==
Functional redundancy refers to the phenomenon that species in the same ecosystem fill similar roles, which results in a sort of "insurance" in the ecosystem. Redundant species can easily do the job of a similar species from the same functional niche. This is possible because similar species have adapted to fill the same niche overtime. Functional redundancy varies across ecosystems and can vary from year to year depending on multiple factors including habitat availability, overall species diversity, competition for resources, and anthropogenic influence. This variation can lead to a fluctuation in overall ecosystem production. It is not always known how many species occupy a functional niche, and how much, if any, redundancy is occurring in each niche in an ecosystem. It is hypothesized that each important functional niche is filled by multiple species. Similar to functional diversity, there is no one clear method for calculating functional redundancy accurately, which can be problematic. One method is to account for the number of species occupying a functional niche, as well as the abundance of each species. This can indicate how many total individuals in an ecosystem are performing one function.

Effective functional redundancy is significantly driven by biome productivity in terrestrial mammals, peaking in productive biomes like the tropical deciduous woodland and the evergreen equatorial rainforest. The positive correlation between energy input and trophic diversification reinforces the hypothesis that energetic richness promotes the complexity and resilience of ecosystems.

== Effects on conservation ==
Studies relating to functional diversity and redundancy occur in a large proportion of conservation and ecological research. As the human population increases, the need for ecosystem function subsequently increases. In addition, habitat destruction and modification continue to increase, and suitable habitat for many species continues to decrease, this research becomes more important. As the human population continues to expand and become urbanized, native and natural landscapes are disappearing, being replaced with modified and managed land for human consumption. Alterations to landscapes are often accompanied with negative side effects including fragmentation, species losses, and nutrient runoff, which can affect the stability of an ecosystem, productivity of an ecosystem, and the functional diversity and functional redundancy by decreasing species diversity.

It has been shown that intense land use affects both the species diversity and functional overlap, leaving the ecosystem and organisms in it vulnerable. Specifically, bee species, which we rely on for pollination services, have both lower functional diversity and species diversity in managed landscapes when compared to natural habitats, indicating that anthropogenic change can be detrimental for organismal functional diversity, and therefore overall ecosystem functional diversity. Additional research demonstrated that the functional redundancy of herbivorous insects in streams varies due to stream velocity, demonstrating that environmental factors can alter functional overlap. When conservation efforts begin, it is still up for debate whether preserving specific species or functional traits is a more beneficial approach for the preservation of ecosystem function. Higher species diversity can lead to an increase in overall ecosystem productivity, but does not necessarily insure the security of functional overlap. In ecosystems with high redundancy, losing a species (which lowers overall functional diversity) will not always lower overall ecosystem function due to high functional overlap, and thus in this instance it is most important to conserve a group, rather than an individual. In ecosystems with dominant species, which contribute to a majority of the biomass output, it may be more beneficial to conserve this single species, rather than a functional group. The ecological concept of keystone species was redefined based on the presence of species with non redundant trophic dynamics with measured biomass dominance within functional groups, which highlights the conservation benefits of protecting both species and their respective functional group.

=== Challenge ===
Understanding functional diversity and redundancy, and the roles each play in conservation efforts, is often hard to accomplish because the tools with which we measure diversity and redundancy cannot be used interchangeably. Due to this, recent empirical work most often analyzes the effects of either functional diversity or functional redundancy, but not both. This does not create a complete picture of the factors influencing ecosystem production. In ecosystems with similar and diverse vegetation, functional diversity is more important for overall ecosystem stability and productivity. Yet, in contrast, functional diversity of native bee species in highly managed landscapes provided evidence for higher functional redundancy leading to higher fruit production, something humans rely heavily on for food consumption. A recent paper has stated that until a more accurate measuring technique is universally used, it is too early to determine which species, or functional groups, are most vulnerable and susceptible to extinction. Overall, understanding how extinction affects ecosystems, and which traits are most vulnerable, can protect ecosystems as a whole.

== See also ==
- Guild (ecology)
