= Local Biodiversity Action Plan =

In the United Kingdom a local biodiversity action plan (LBAP, pronounced 'ell-bap') is a plan aimed at conserving the fauna, flora and habitats – collectively referred to as biodiversity – of a defined area, usually along local authority boundary lines.

The development of such plans at a local level is guided by the publication of a biodiversity action plan at national i.e. UK level and executed locally by 'biodiversity partnerships' which include key stakeholders from different sectors.

== LBAPs in the constituent parts of the UK ==
Progress on local plans is overseen by different agencies in each of the four administrations.

=== England ===
As of January 2012, there were many dozens of LBAPs in England overseen by the statutory agency Natural England.

=== Northern Ireland ===
The Northern Ireland Environment Agency oversees the production of LBAPs in the province.

=== Scotland ===
As at January 2012 there were 25 LBAPs in place covering each of Scotland's local authority areas and both the Cairngorms and Loch Lomond and The Trossachs national parks.

=== Wales ===
By January 2012 there were LBAPs published or in draft form for each of 24 areas identified across Wales including the three national parks. The Wales Biodiversity Partnership brings together most of the main players across Wales to assist in the process of assembling and delivering LBAPs.
