= Arhopala siabra =

Scientific classification
- Kingdom: Animalia
- Phylum: Arthropoda
- Class: Insecta
- Order: Lepidoptera
- Family: Lycaenidae
- Genus: Arhopala
- Species: A. siabra

Binomial name
- Arhopala siabra Corbet, 1941

Synonyms
- Narathura siabra

Species of butterfly

Arhopala siabra is a butterfly in the family Lycaenidae. It was discovered by Alexander Steven Corbet in 1941. It is found in Pulau Laut.

== Description ==
It is similar to Arhopala baluensis on the upperside but the wings are more produced. The underside has broad markings.
