= Island =

Piece of subcontinental land surrounded by water

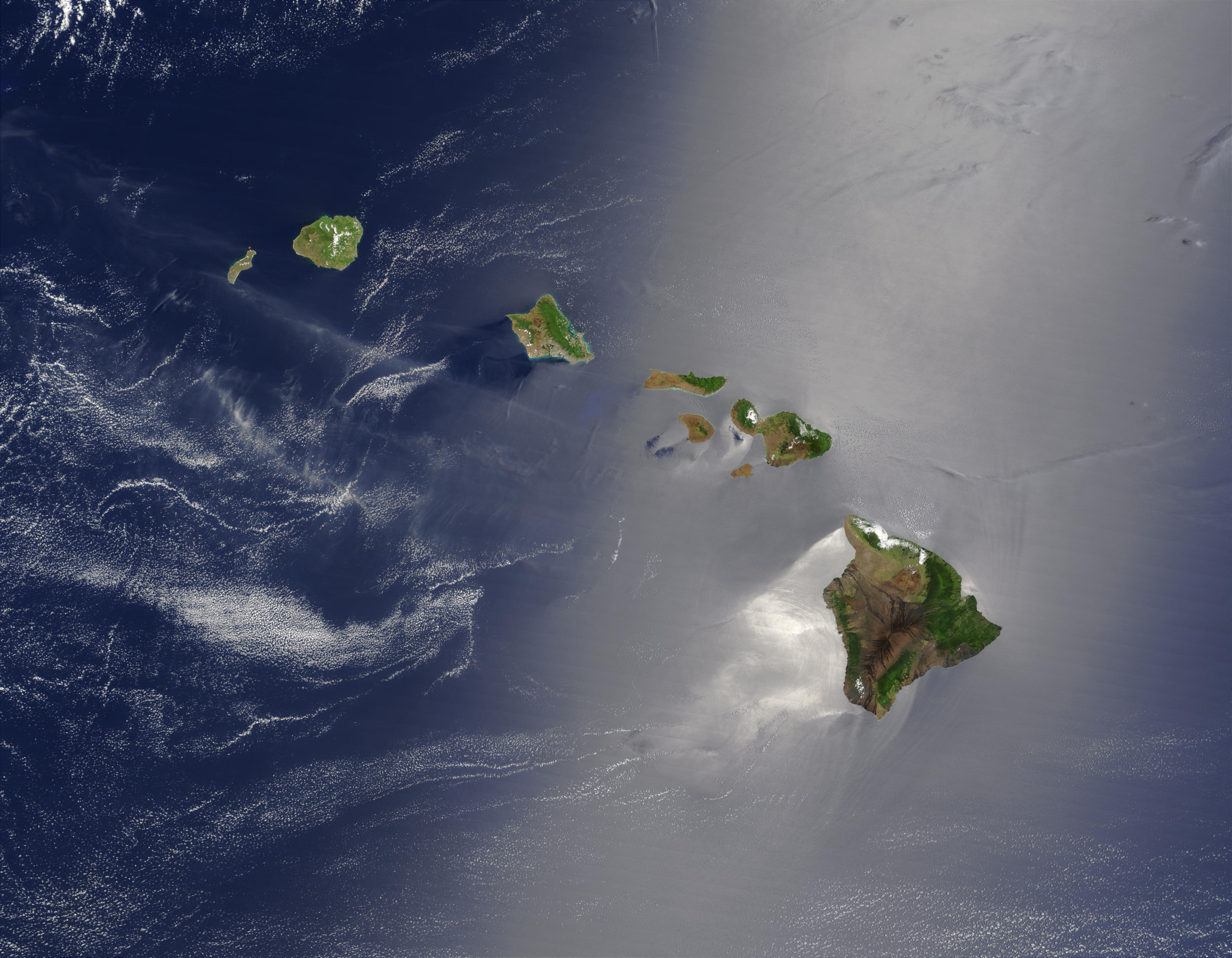
The Hawaiian Islands, a major archipelago in the Pacific Ocean

An island (/ˈaɪ.lənd/ EYE-lənd) or isle is a piece of land, distinct from a continent, completely surrounded by water. There are continental islands, which were formed by being split from a continent by plate tectonics, and oceanic islands, which have never been part of a continent. Oceanic islands can be formed from volcanic activity, grow into atolls from coral reefs, and form from sediment along shorelines, creating barrier islands. River islands can also form from sediment and debris in rivers. Artificial islands are those made by humans, including small rocky outcroppings built out of lagoons and large-scale land reclamation projects used for development.

Islands are host to diverse plant and animal life. Oceanic islands have the sea as a natural barrier to the introduction of new species, causing the species that do reach the island to evolve in isolation. Continental islands share animal and plant life with the continent they split from. Depending on how long ago the continental island formed, the life on that island may have diverged greatly from the mainland due to natural selection.

Humans have lived on and traveled between islands for thousands of years at a minimum. Some islands became host to humans due to a land bridge or a continental island splitting from the mainland, or by boat travel. In the far north or south some islands are joined by seasonal or glacial ice. Today, up to 10% of the world's population lives on islands. Islands are popular targets for tourism due to their perceived natural beauty, isolation, and unique cultures.

Islands became the target of colonization by Europeans, resulting in the majority of islands in the Pacific being put under European control. Decolonization has resulted in some but not all island nations becoming self-governing, with lasting effects related to industrialisation, invasive species, nuclear weapons testing, and tourism. Islands and island countries are threatened by climate change. Sea level rise threatens to submerge nations such as Maldives, the Marshall Islands, and Tuvalu completely. Increases in the frequency and intensity of tropical cyclones can cause widespread destruction of infrastructure and animal habitats. Species that live exclusively on islands are some of those most threatened by extinction.

== Definition ==
Dymaxion map (Fuller map) with continental landmasses (I,II,III,IV) and largest islands (1–30) roughly to scale

An island is an area of land surrounded by water on all sides that is distinct from a continent. There is no standard of size that distinguishes islands and continents. Continents have an accepted geological definition – they are the largest landmass of a particular tectonic plate. Islands can occur in any body of water, including lakes, rivers, and seas. Low-tide elevations, areas of land that are not above the surface during a high tide, are generally not considered islands. Islands that have been bridged or otherwise joined to a mainland with land reclamation are sometimes considered "de-islanded", but not in every case.

== Etymology ==
The word island derives from Middle English iland, from Old English igland, itself from ig or ieg, similarly meaning 'island' when used independently, and with the suffix -land carrying its contemporary meaning. Old English ieg is actually a cognate of Swedish ö and German Aue, and more distantly related to Latin aqua (water).

The spelling of the word with ⟨s⟩ was modified in the 15th century because of a false etymology caused by an association with the Old French loanword isle, which itself comes from the Latin word insula.

== Geology ==
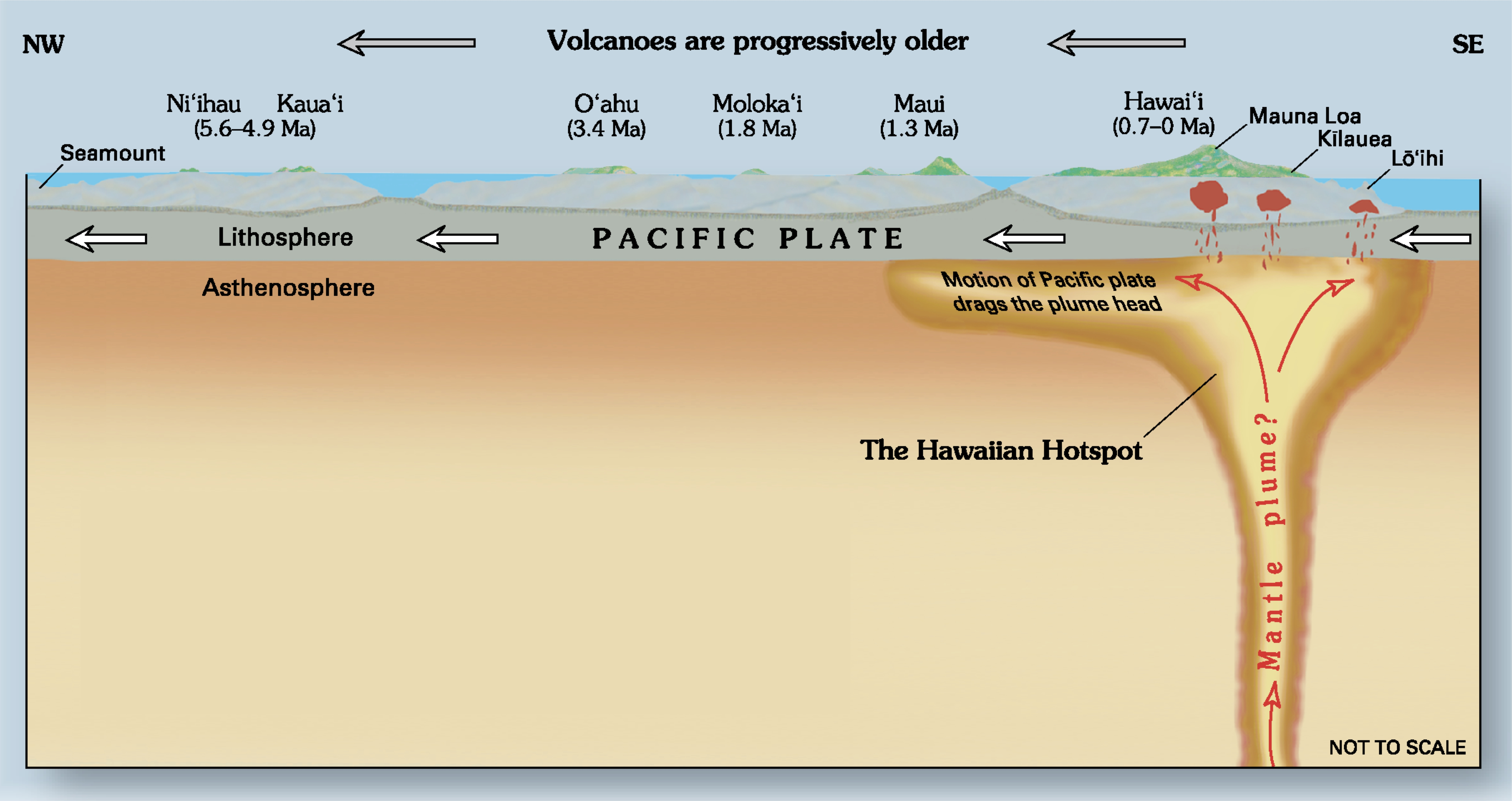
Cross section through Earth at the Hawaii hotspot. Magma from the mantle rises into the lithosphere, creating a chain of volcanoes as the lithosphere moves over the hotspot.

=== Formation in oceans ===
Islands often are found in archipelagos or island chains, which are collections of islands. These chains are thought to form from volcanic hotspots, areas of the lithosphere where the mantle is hotter than the surrounding area. These hotspots would give rise to volcanoes whose lava would form the rock the islands are made of. For some islands, the movement of tectonic plates above stationary hotspots would form islands in a linear chain, with the islands further away from the hotspot being progressively older and more eroded, before disappearing under the sea entirely. An example is the Hawaiian Islands, with the oldest island being 25 million years old, and the youngest, Hawaii, still being an active volcano. However, not all island chains are formed this way. Some may be formed all at once by fractures in the tectonic plates themselves, simultaneously creating multiple islands. One supporting piece of evidence is that of the Line Islands, which are all estimated to be 8 million years old, rather than being different ages.

Other island chains form due to being separated from existing continents. The Japanese archipelago may have been separated from Eurasia due to seafloor spreading, a phenomenon where new oceanic crust is formed, pushing away older crust. Islands sitting on the continental shelf may be called continental islands. Other islands, like those that make up New Zealand, are what remains of continents that shrank and sank beneath the sea. It was estimated that Zealandia, the continent-like area of crust that New Zealand sits on, has had 93% of its original surface area submerged.

Some islands are formed when coral reefs grow on volcanic islands that have submerged beneath the surface. When these coral islands encircle a central lagoon, the island is known as an atoll. The formation of reefs and islands related to those reefs is aided by the buildup of sediment in shallow patches of water. In some cases, tectonic movements lifting a reef out of the water by as little as 1 meter can cause sediment to accumulate and an island to form.

Barrier islands are long, sandy bars that form along shorelines due to the deposition of sediment by waves. These islands erode and grow as the wind and waves shift. Barrier islands have the effect of protecting coastal areas from severe weather because they absorb some of the energy of large waves before they can reach the shore.

Antarctic islands, are sometimes permanently connected to another land mass by sea or glacial ice. An example of this is Ross Island in Antarctica.

=== Formation in freshwater ===
A fluvial island is an island that forms from the erosion and sedimentation of debris in rivers; almost all rivers have some form of fluvial islands. These islands may only be a few meters high, and are usually temporary. Changes in the flow speed, water level, and sediment content of the river may affect the rate of fluvial island formation and depletion. Permanent river islands also exist, the largest of which (that is completely inland) is Bananal Island in the Tocantins of Brazil, which has a maximum width of 55 kilometers.

Lakes form for a variety of reasons, including glaciers, plate tectonics, and volcanism. Lake islands can form as part of these processes.

== Life on islands ==
The field of insular biogeography studies the ecological processes that take place on islands, with a focus on what factors effect the evolution, extinction, and richness of species. Scientists often study islands as an isolated model of how the process of natural selection takes place. Island ecology studies organisms on islands and their environment. It has yielded important insights for its parent field of ecology since the time of Charles Darwin.

=== Endemism ===
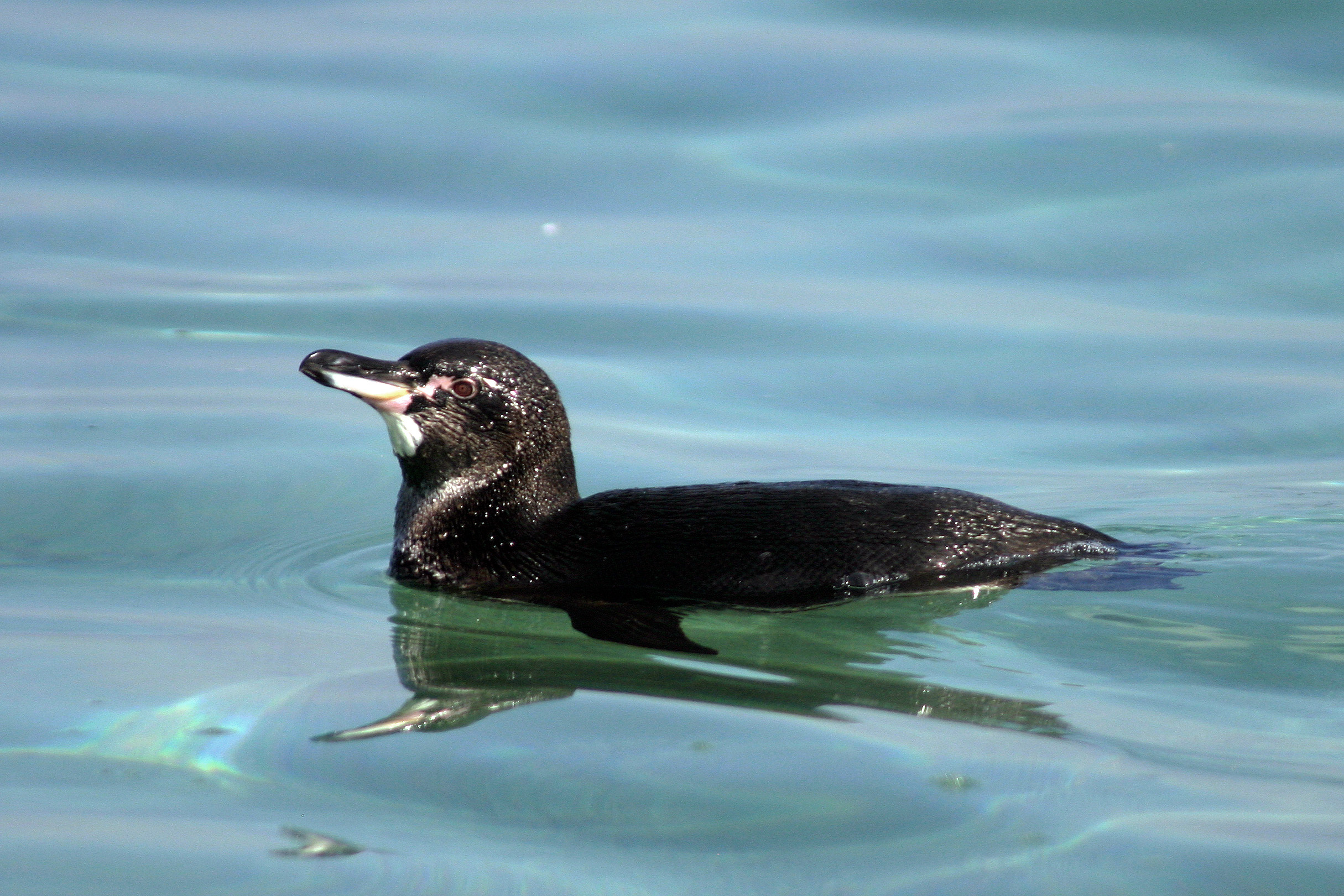
The Galapagos penguin is endemic to the Galápagos Islands.

In biology, endemism is defined as the phenomenon where species or genus is only found in a certain geographical area. Islands isolate land organisms from others with water, and isolate aquatic organisms living on them with land. Island ecosystems have the highest rates of endemism globally. This means that islands contribute heavily to global biodiversity. Areas with high lives of biodiversity are a priority target of conservation efforts, to prevent the extinction of these species. Despite high levels of endemism, the total species richness, the total number of unique species in a region, is lower on islands than on mainlands. The level of species richness on islands is proportional to the area of that island, a phenomenon known as the species-area relationship. This is because larger areas have more resources and thus can support more organisms. Populations with a higher carrying capacity also have more genetic diversity, which promotes speciation.

=== Dispersal ===
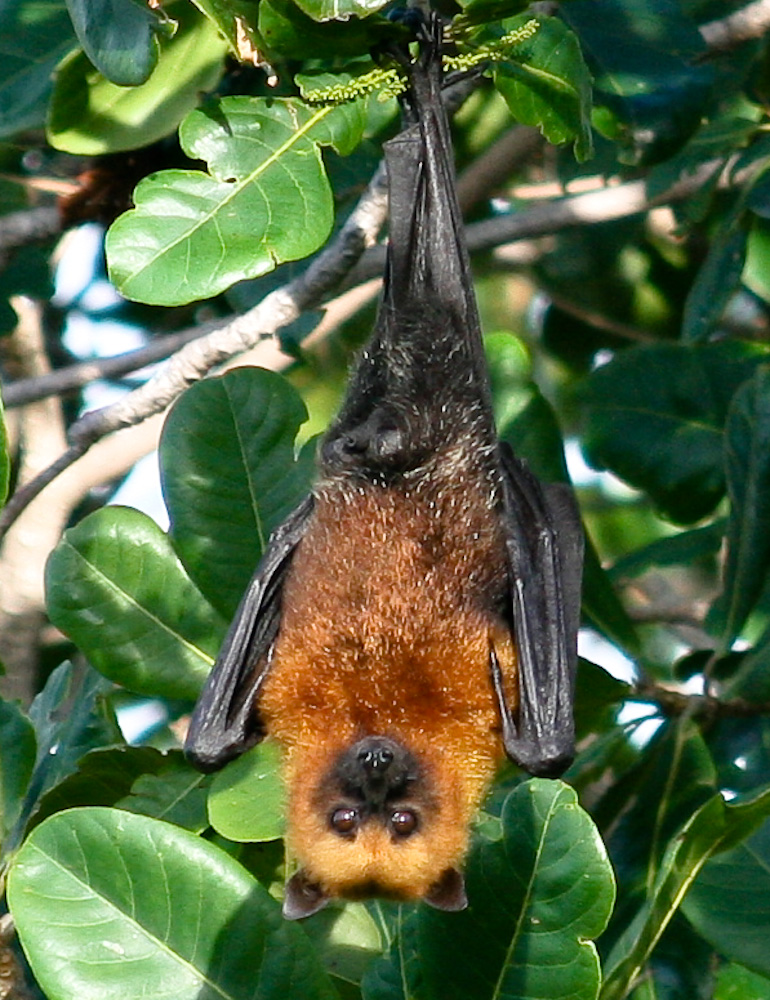
The Seychelles fruit bat has a major role in distributing the seeds of trees between islands, a form of oceanic dispersal.

Oceanic islands, ones that have never been connected to shore, are only populated by life that can cross the sea. This means that any animals present on the island had to have flown there, in the case of birds or bats, were carried by such animals, or were carried in a sea current in what is known as a "rafting event". This phenomenon is known as oceanic dispersal. Tropical cyclones have the capacity to transport species over great distances. Animals like tortoises can live for weeks without food or water, and are able to survive floating on debris in the sea. One case study showed that in 1995, fifteen iguanas survived a 300 km journey to Anguilla in the Caribbean, an island which no iguana had lived on previously. They survived floating on a mass of uprooted trees from a storm. Plant species are thought to be able to travel great distances of ocean. New Zealand and Australia share 200 native plant species, despite being separated by 1500 km.

Continental islands, islands that were at one point connected to a continent, are expected to share a common history of plant and animal life up until the point that the island broke away from the continent. For example, the presence of freshwater fish on an island surrounded by ocean would indicate that it once was attached to a continent, since these fish cannot traverse the ocean on their own. Over the course of time, evolution and extinction changes the nature of animal life on a continental island, but only once it splits from the mainland. An example is that of the southern beech, a tree that is present in Australia, New Zealand, parts of South American, and New Guinea, places that today are geographically distant. A possible explanation for this phenomenon is that these landmasses were once all part of the continent Gondwana and separated by tectonic drift. However, there are competing theories that suggest this species may have reached faraway places by way of oceanic dispersal.

=== Evolution on island groups ===
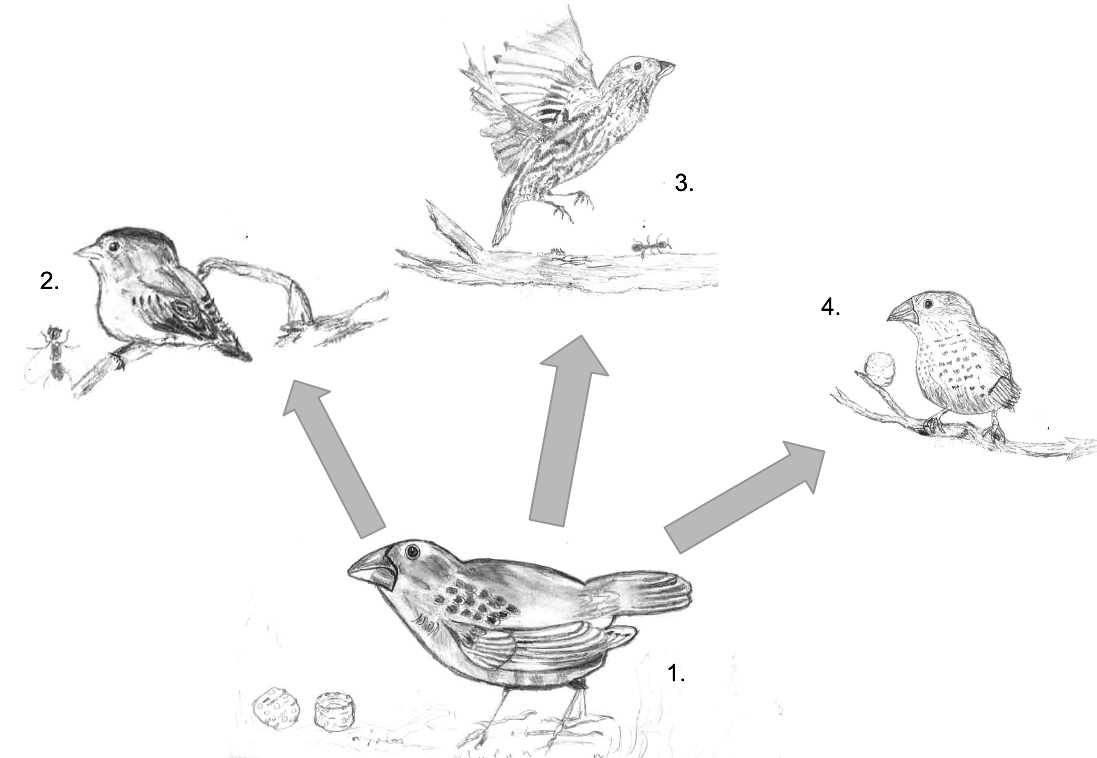
Adaptive radiation of finch A (Geospiza magnirostris) into three other species of finches on the Galapagos Islands. Due to the absence of other birds, Darwin's finches adapted to new niches. Their seed-eating beaks evolved to handle foods such as nuts, fruits, and insects.

Species that colonize island archipelagos exhibit a specific property known as adaptive radiation. In this process, a species that arrives on a group of islands rapidly becomes more diverse over time, splitting off into new species or subspecies. A species that reaches an island ecosystem may face little competition for resources, or may find that the resources that they found in their previous habitat are not available. These factors together result in individual evolutionary branches with different means of survival.

The classical example of this is Darwin's finches, a group of up to fifteen tanager species that are endemic to the Galápagos Islands. These birds evolved different beaks in order to eat different kinds of food available on the islands. The large ground finch has a large bill used to crack seeds and eat fruit. The Genovesa cactus finch prefers cacti as a food source, and has a beak adapted for removing pulp and flowers from cacti. The green warbler-finch (in the habit of true warbler species) consumes spiders and insects that live on plants. Other examples of this phenomenon exist worldwide, including in Hawaii and Madagascar, and are not limited to island ecosystems.

==== The island rule ====
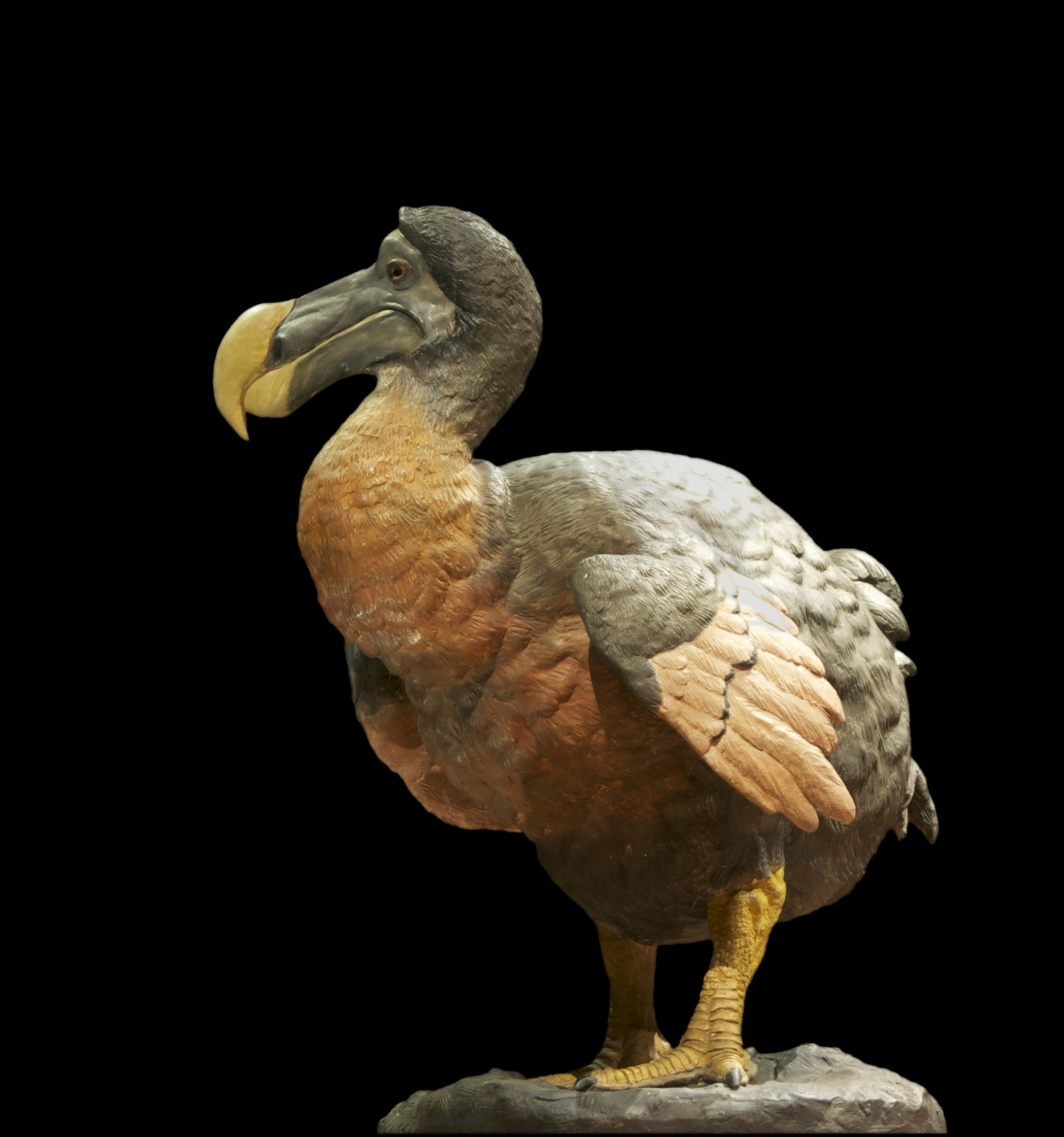
The extinct Dodo is an example of island gigantism.

Species endemic to islands show a common evolutionary trajectory. Foster's rule (also known as the island rule), states that small mammals such as rodents evolve to become larger, known as island gigantism. One such example is the giant tortoise of the Seychelles, though it is unknown if it grew in size before or after reaching the island. Larger animals such as the hippopotamus tend to become smaller, such as in the case of the pygmy hippopotamus. This is known as insular dwarfism. In the case of smaller animals, it has been hypothesized that animals on islands may have fewer predators and competitors, resulting in selection pressure towards larger animals. Larger animals may exhaust food resources quickly due to their size, causing malnutrition in their young, resulting in a selection pressure for smaller animals that require less food. Having fewer predators would mean these animals did not need not be large to survive.

=== Darwin, the Galápagos, and natural selection ===
Charles Darwin formulated the theory of natural selection through the study of island ecology. The species he observed on the Galápagos Islands, including tanager birds, contributed to his understanding of how evolution works. He first traveled to the islands as a naturalist on HMS Beagle in 1835, as part of a five-year circumnavigation of Earth. He wrote that "the different islands to a considerable extent are inhabited by a different set of beings". Through the study of the finches and other animals he realized that organisms survive by changing to adapt to their habitat. It would be over twenty years before he published his theories in On the Origin of Species.

== Humans and islands ==
=== History of exploration ===
Chronological dispersal of the Austronesian peoples

The first evidence of humans colonizing islands probably occurred in the Paleolithic era, 100,000 to 200,000 years ago. Reaching the Indonesian islands of Flores and Timor would have required crossing distances of water of at least 29 km (18 mi). Some islands, such as Honshu, were probably connected to the mainland with a land bridge that allowed humans to colonize it before it became an island.

The first people to colonize distant oceanic islands were the Polynesians. Many of the previous island settlements required traveling distances of less than 100 km (62 mi), whereas Polynesians may have traveled 2,000–3,200 km (1,200–2,000 mi) to settle islands such as Tahiti. They would send navigators to sail the ocean without the aid of navigational instruments to discover new islands for settlement. Between 1100 and 800 BC, Polynesians sailed East from New Guinea and the Solomon Islands and reached the islands that make up the modern-day Fiji and Samoa. The furthest extent of this migration would be Easter Island in the East, and New Zealand in the South, with New Zealand's first settlements between 1250 and 1300.

Historians have sought to understand why some remote islands have always been uninhabited, while others, especially in the Pacific Ocean, have long been populated by humans. Generally, larger islands are more likely to be able to sustain humans and thus are more likely to have been settled. Small islands that cannot sustain populations on their own can still be habitable if they are within a "commuting" distance to an island that has enough resources to be sustainable. The presence of an island is marked by seabirds, differences in cloud and weather patterns, as well as changes in the direction of waves. It is also possible for human populations to have gone extinct on islands, evidenced by explorers finding islands that show evidence of habitation but no life.

Not all islands were or are inhabited by maritime cultures. In the past, some societies were found to have lost their seafaring ability over time, such as the case of the Canary Islands, which were occupied by an indigenous people since the island's first discovery in the first century until being conquered by the Spanish Empire in 1496. It has been hypothesized that since the inhabitants had little incentive for trade and had little to any contact with the mainland, they had no need for boats.

The motivation for island exploration has been the subject of research and debate. Some early historians previously argued that early island colonization was unintentional, perhaps by a raft being swept out to sea. Others compare the motivations of Polynesian and similar explorers with those of Christopher Columbus, the explorer who sailed westward over the Atlantic Ocean in search of an alternate route to the East Indies. These historians theorize that successful explorers were rewarded with recognition and wealth, leading others to attempt possibly dangerous expeditions to discover more islands, usually with poor results.

=== Lifestyle ===
About 10% of the world's population lives on islands. The study of the culture of islands is known as island studies. The interest in the study of islands is due to their unique cultures and natural environments that differ from mainland cultures. This is for a few reasons: First, the obvious political and geographic isolation from mainland cultures. Second, unique restraints on resources and ecology creating marine-focused cultures with a focus on fishing and sailing. Third, a lasting historical and political significance of islands.

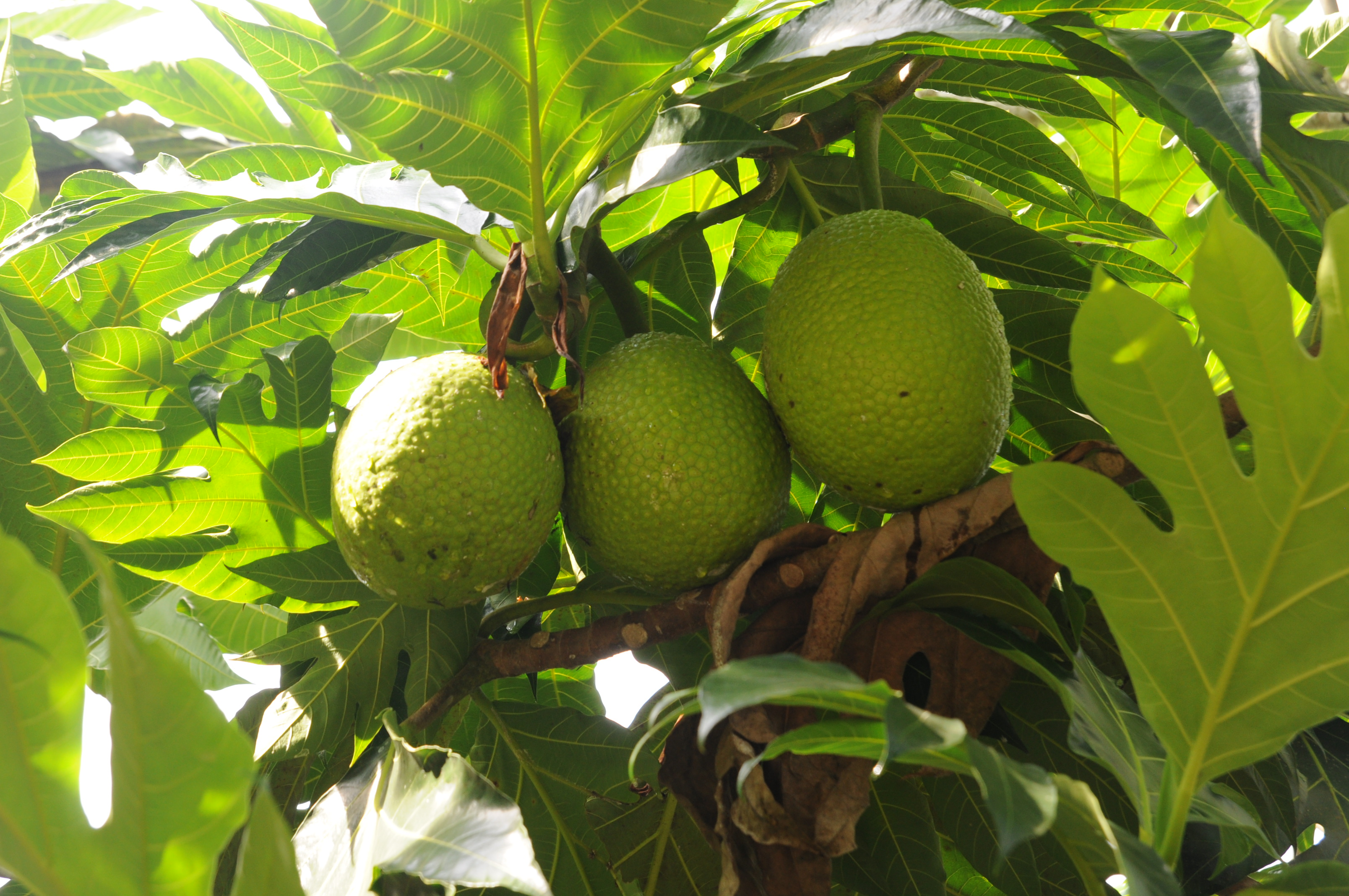
A breadfruit tree in Malaysia, used in Polynesia for making an edible breadfruit paste.

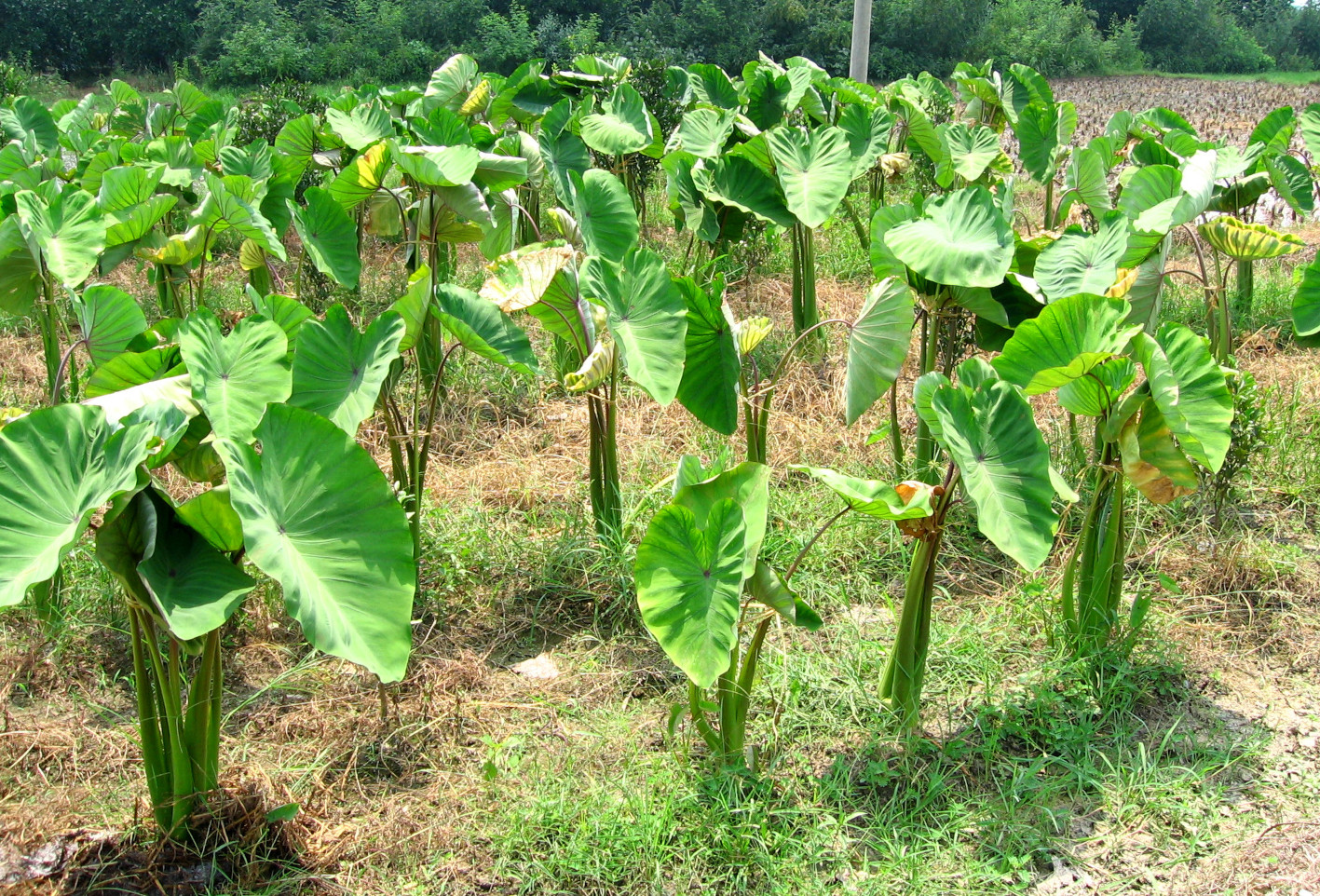
Cultivated taro plants, a staple food for many island cultures.

==== Diet ====
The Polynesian diet got most of its protein from fishing. Polynesians were known to fish close to shore, as well as in deep water. It was reported that Rapa Nui people were known to fish as far as 500 km (310 mi) from shore at coral reefs. Spear, line, and net fishing were all used, to catch tuna as well as sharks and stingrays. Island cultures also cultivate native and non-native crops. Polynesians grew the native yam, taro, breadfruit, banana, coconut and other fruits and vegetables. Different island climates made different resources more important, such as the Hawaiian islands being home to irrigated fields of taro, whereas in some islands, like Tahiti, breadfruit was more widely cultivated and fermented in order to preserve it. There is archeological evidence that Canary Islanders would chew the roots of ferns for sustenance, a practice that wore heavily on their molars. These islanders would also grow barley and raised livestock such as goats.

=== Island nations and territories ===
Many island nations have little land and a restricted set of natural resources. However, these nations control some of the largest fisheries in the world, deposits of copper, gold, and nickel, as well as oil deposits. The natural beauty of island nations also makes them a magnet for tourism. Islands also have geopolitical value for naval bases, weapons testing, and general territorial control. One such example is French Polynesia, a territory that receives substantial military expenditure and aid from France. Three others, Palau, Federated States of Micronesia, and the Marshall Islands, are island nations of the Pacific region that maintain a defense, aid, and immigration agreement with the United States called a Compact of Free Association.

==== Colonization ====
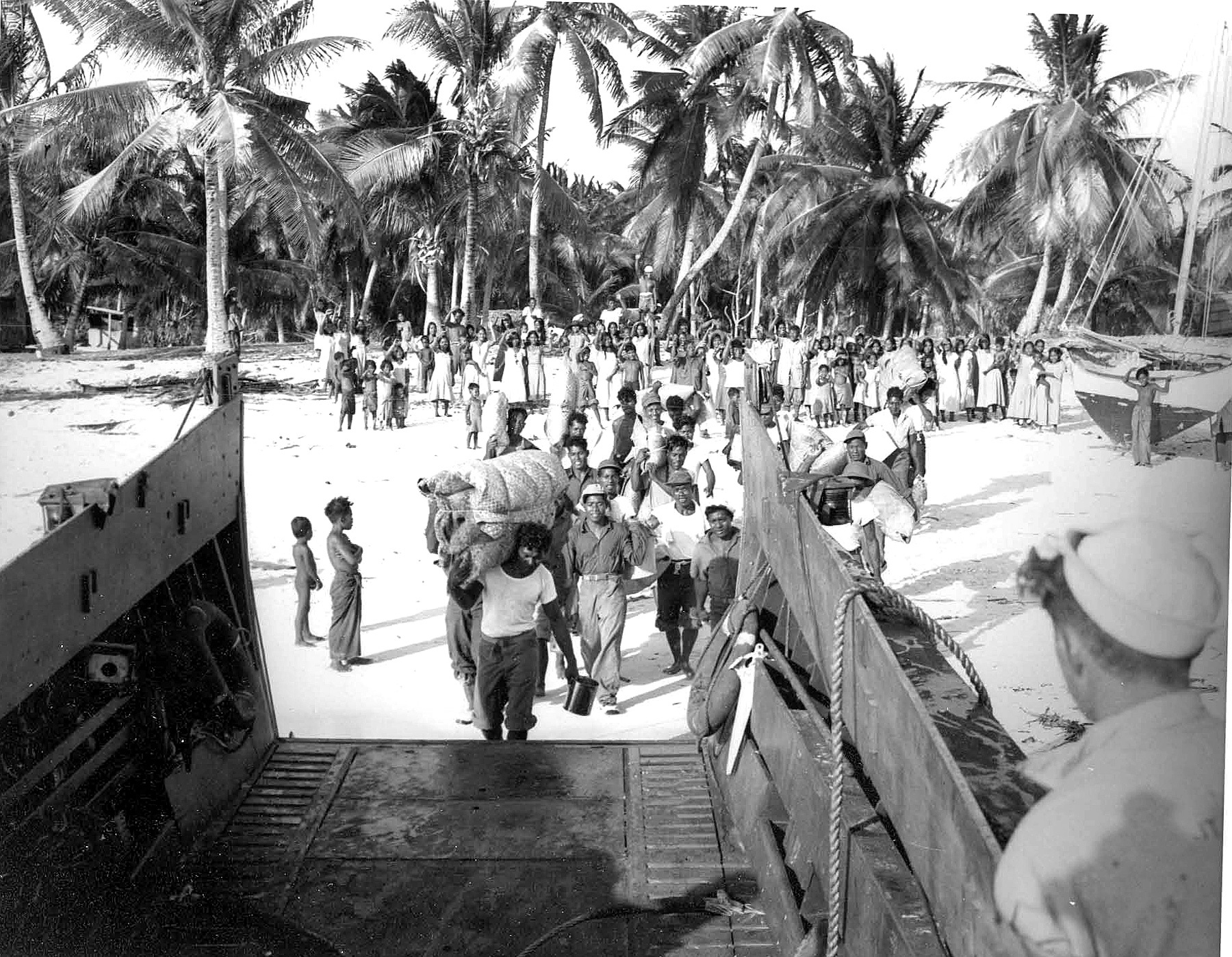
Residents of Bikini Atoll leaving due to nuclear testing.

Since the first discoveries of Polynesian, Micronesian, and other islands by Westerners, these nations have been the subject of colonization. Islands were the target of Christian missionaries. These missionaries faced resistance, but found success when some local chiefs used European support to centralize power. Beginning in the 16th century, European states placed most of Oceania in under colonial administration. Pohnpei was colonized by Spain as early as 1526. It changed hands from Germany to Japan to the United States before joining the Federated States of Micronesia in 1982, maintaining a "free association" status with the U.S. Guam was a Spanish territory until 1898, and now is an unincorporated territory of the U.S.

The decolonization era saw many island states achieve independence or some form of self-governance. Nuclear weapons testing on the Marshall Islands left many atolls destroyed or uninhabitable, causing the forced displacement of people from their home islands as well as increases in cancer rates due to radiation. Colonization has resulted in a decline of observance of traditional cultural practices in places such as Hawaii, where Native Hawaiians are now a minority. Cultural attitudes related to communal ownership of land as well as a lack of individualistic decision-making may make some island cultures less compatible with the global capitalist economy, causing these nations to experience less economic growth.

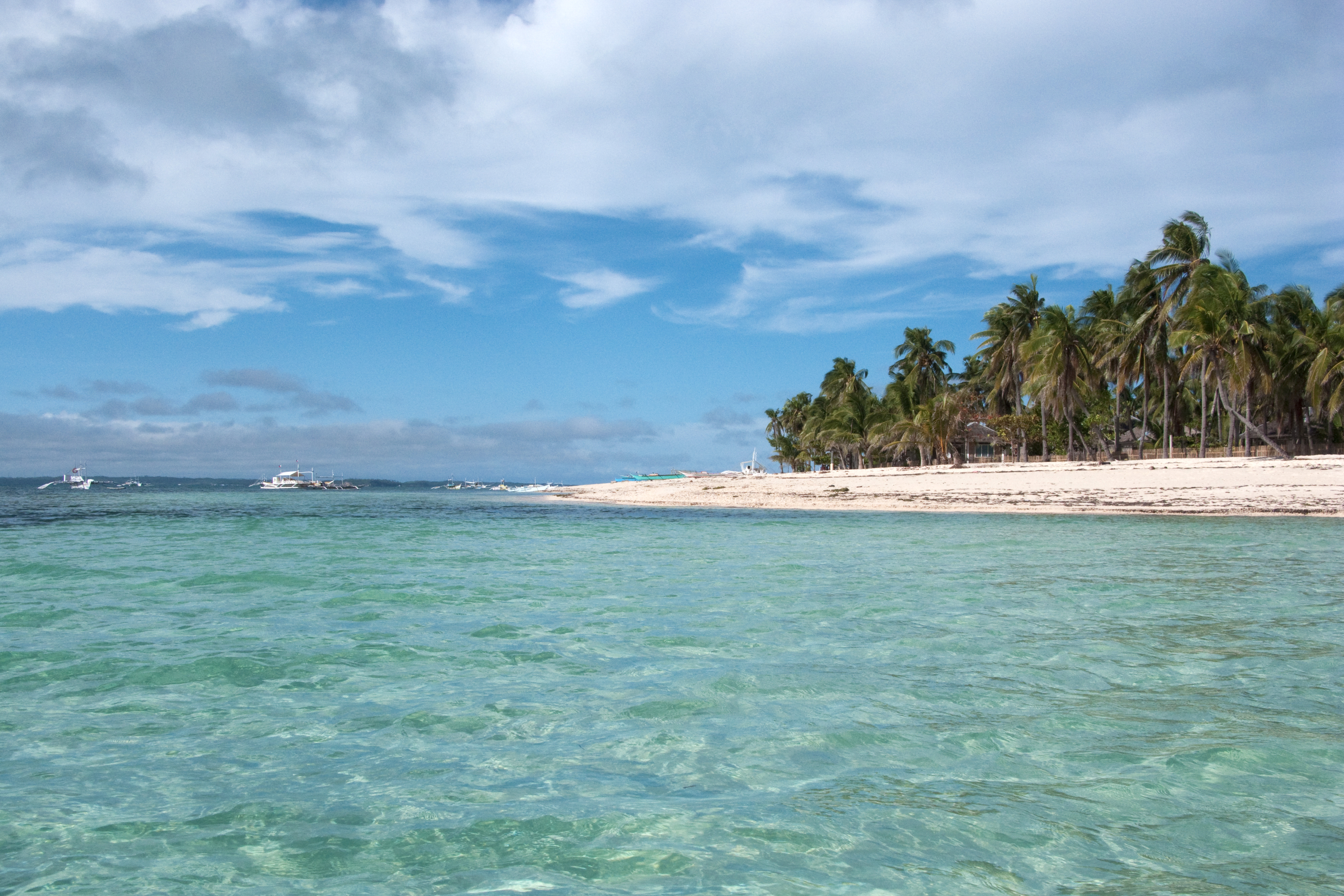
Tourists are attracted to tropical beaches in large numbers, such as this one in Malapascua, the Philippines.

=== Tourism ===
Islands have long been a popular target for tourism, thanks to their unique climates, cultures, and natural beauty. However, islands may suffer from poor transportation connectivity from airplanes and boats and strains on infrastructure from tourist activity. Islands in colder climates often rely on seasonal tourists seeking to enjoy nature or local cultures, and may only be one aspect of an island's economy. In contrast, tourism on tropical islands can often make up the majority of the local economy and built environment. These islands sometimes also require consistent foreign aid on top of tourism in order to ensure economic growth. This reliance can result in social inequality and environmental degradation. During tourism downturns, these economies struggle to make up the lost inflow of cash with other industries.

== Threats to islands ==
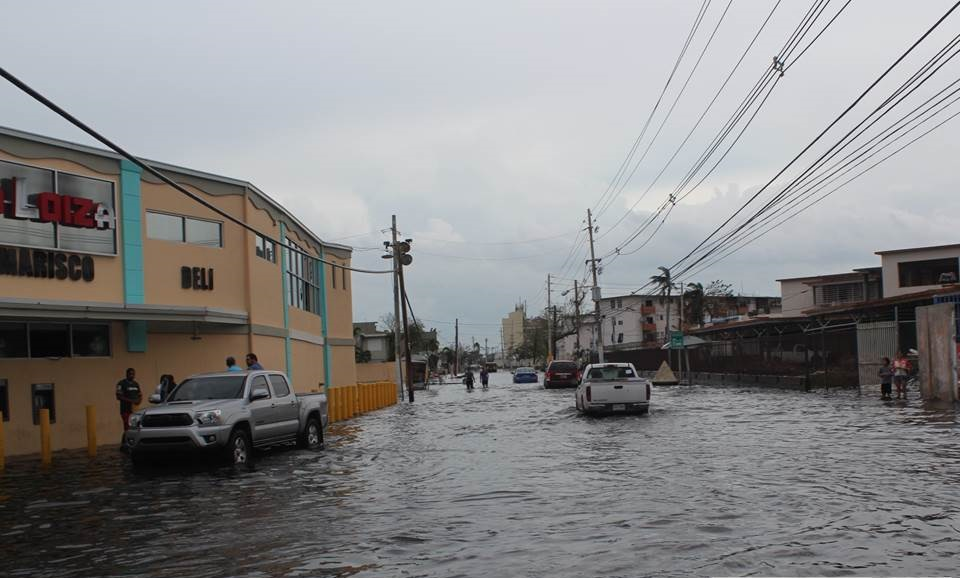
San Juan, Puerto Rico after Hurricane Maria. Climate change is expected to cause more frequent inland flooding on islands.

Climate change threatens human development on islands due to sea level rise, more dangerous tropical cyclones, coral bleaching, and an increase in invasive species. For example, in 2017 Hurricane Maria caused a loss of almost all the infrastructure in Dominica. Sea level rise and other climate changes can reduce freshwater reserves, resulting in droughts. These risks are expected to decrease the habitability of islands, especially small ones. Beyond risks to human life, plant and animal life are threatened. It has been estimated that almost 50 percent of land species threatened by extinction live on islands. In 2017, a detailed review of 1,288 islands found that they were home to 1,189 highly-threatened vertebrate species, which was 41 percent of the global figure. Coral bleaching is expected to occur with more frequency, threatening marine ecosystems, some of which island economies are dependent on.

Some islands that are low-lying may cease to exist given high enough amounts of sea level rise. Tuvalu received media attention for a press conference publicizing the ongoing submerging of the island country. Tuvalu signed a cooperation agreement with Australia agreeing to annually allow 280 of its citizens to become permanent residents of Australia. The Marshall Islands, a country of 1,156 islands, have also been identified as a country that may be existentially threatened by rising seas.

Increasing intensity of tropical storms also increases the distances and frequency with which invasive species may be transported to islands. Floodwaters from these storms may also wash plants further inland than they would travel on their own, introducing them to new habitats. Agriculture and trade also have introduced non-native life to islands. These processes result in an introduction of invasive species to ecosystems that are especially small and fragile. One example is the apple snail, initially introduced to the U.S. by aquarium owners. It has since been transported by hurricanes across the Gulf Coast and neighboring islands. These species compete for resources with native animals, and some may grow so densely that they displace other forms of existing life.

== Artificial islands ==
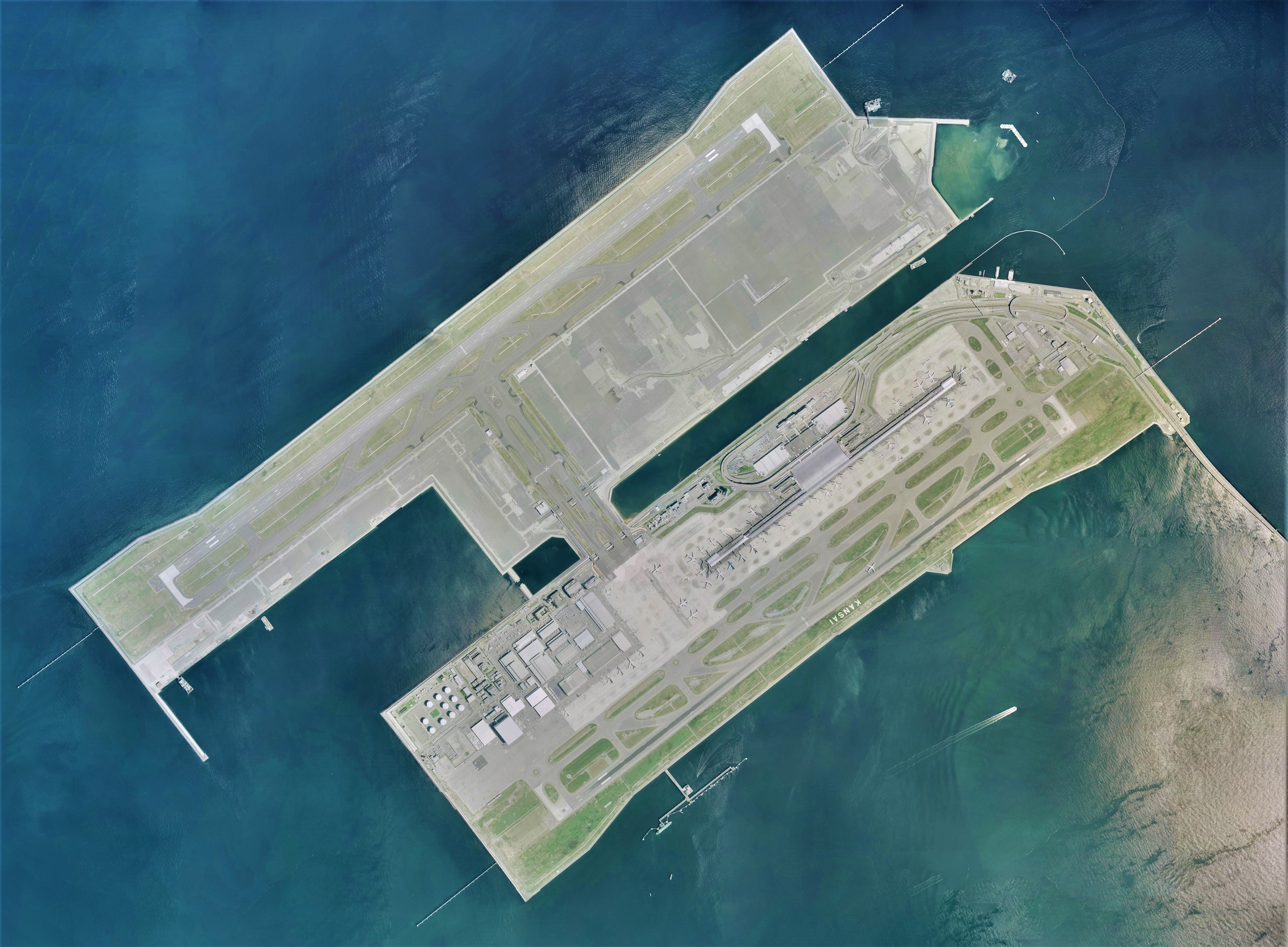
Kansai International Airport in Osaka is built on an artificial island.

For hundreds of years, islands have been created through land reclamation. One of the first recorded instances of this when people of the Solomon Islands created eighty such islands by piling coral and rock in the Lau Lagoon. However, the first permanent artificial island is Al-Sayah island, in Bahrain – created at least 1,200 years ago. One traditional way of constructing islands is with the use of a revetment. Sandbags or stones are dropped with a barge into the sea to bring the land level slightly out of the water. The island area is then filled with sand or gravel, followed by a construction of this revetment to hold it together. Islands have also been constructed with a permanent caisson, a steel or concrete structure built in a closed loop and then filled with sand.

Some modern islands have been constructed by pouring millions of tons of sand into the sea, such as with Pearl Island in Qatar or the Palm Islands in Dubai. These islands are usually created for real estate development, and are sold for private ownership or construction of housing. Offshore oil platforms have also been described as a type of island. Some atolls have been covered in concrete to create artificial islands for military purposes, such as those created by China in the South China Sea. These atolls were previously low-tide elevations, landmasses that are only above water during low tide. The United Nations Convention on the Law of the Sea indicates that these islands may not have the same legal status as a naturally occurring island, and as such may not confer the same legal rights.

== See also ==
- Lists of islands
- List of archipelagos
- List of artificial islands
- List of divided islands
- List of fictional islands
- List of island countries
- List of islands by area
- List of islands by country
- List of islands by highest point
- List of islands by name
- List of islands by population
- List of islands by population density
- List of islands named after people
- Island hopping – Military strategy
- Phantom island – Island recorded on maps but proven nonexistent
- Private island – Island owned by a single private citizen or corporation
- Desert island – Island without human residents
- Tidal island – Island accessible by foot at low tide
- Rock fever – Effect on people who move to islands
- Small Island Developing States – Developing countries that are small island countries
