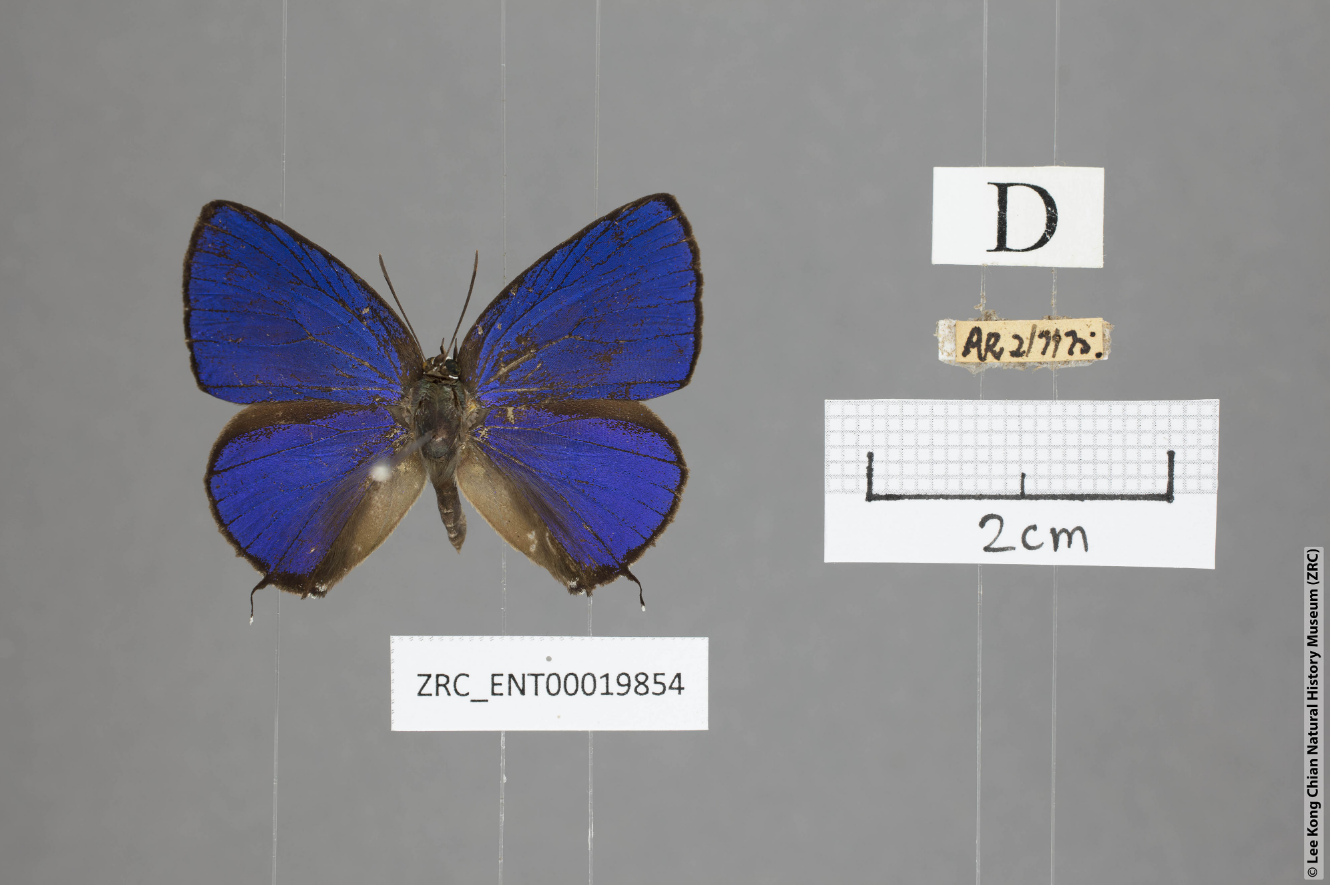
- Upperside
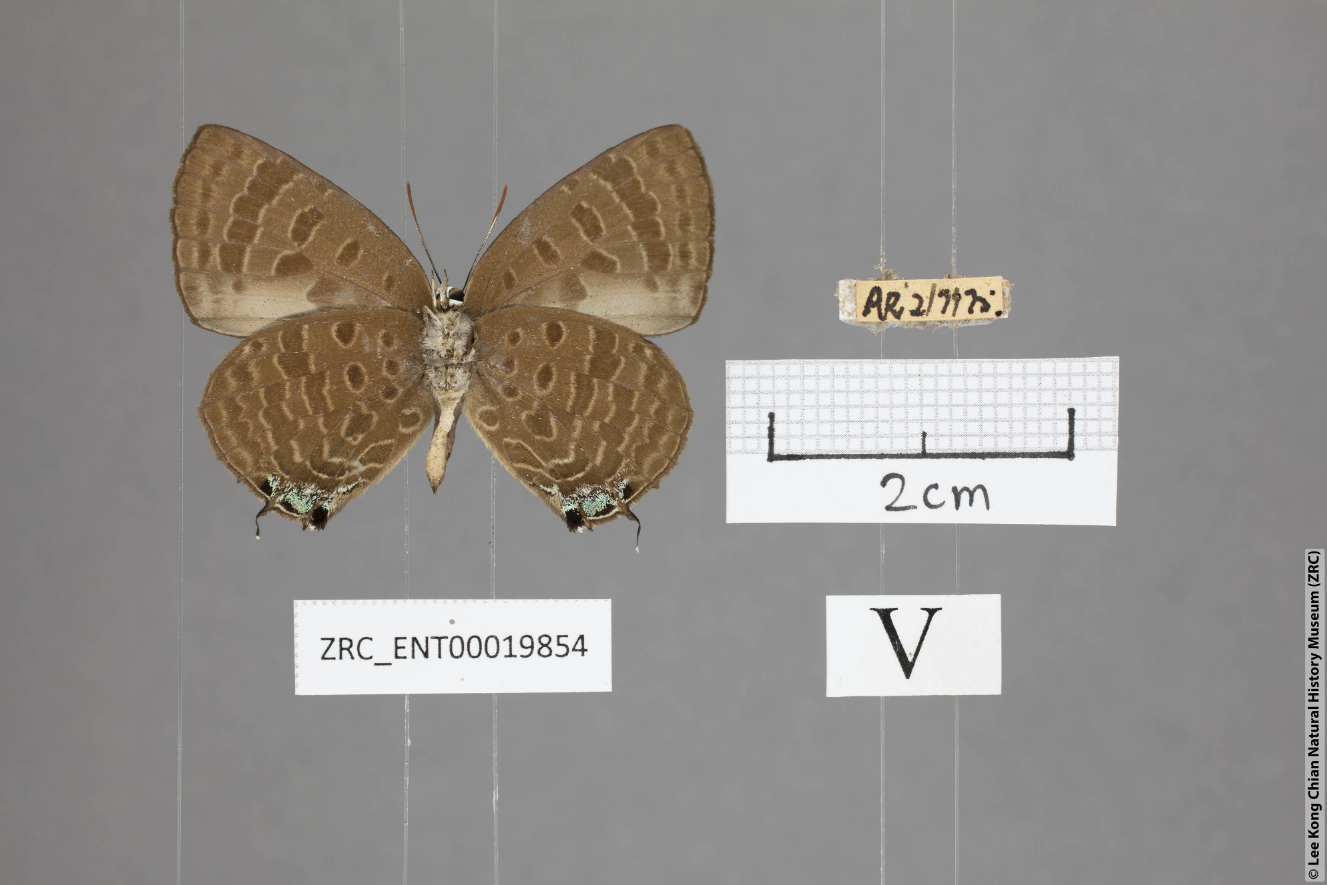
- Underside

Scientific classification
- Kingdom: Animalia
- Phylum: Arthropoda
- Class: Insecta
- Order: Lepidoptera
- Family: Lycaenidae
- Genus: Arhopala
- Species: A. sublustris

Binomial name
- Arhopala sublustris Bethune-Baker, 1904

Synonyms
- Narathura sublustris

= Arhopala sublustris =

Species of butterfly

Arhopala sublustris is a butterfly in the family Lycaenidae. It was discovered by George Thomas Bethune-Baker in 1904. It is found throughout South-east Asia.

== Description ==
The upperside is violaceous blue with a border of 0.5 millimeters. The underside is clear brown with the darker markings palely encircled.

It is differentiated from Arhopala phanda by its darker upperside. Subspecies ridleyi is duller and more purple and karnyi is indigo hue which separates it from subspecies ralanda.

== Subspecies ==
Four subspecies are recognized -

- Arhopala sublustris sublustris (Bethune-Baker, 1904) - Borneo
- Arhopala sublustris ralanda (Corbet, 1941) - Tavoy
- Arhopala sublustris ridleyi (Corbet, 1941) - West Malaysia
- Arhopala sublustris karnyi (Corbet, 1941) - Mentawai Islands
