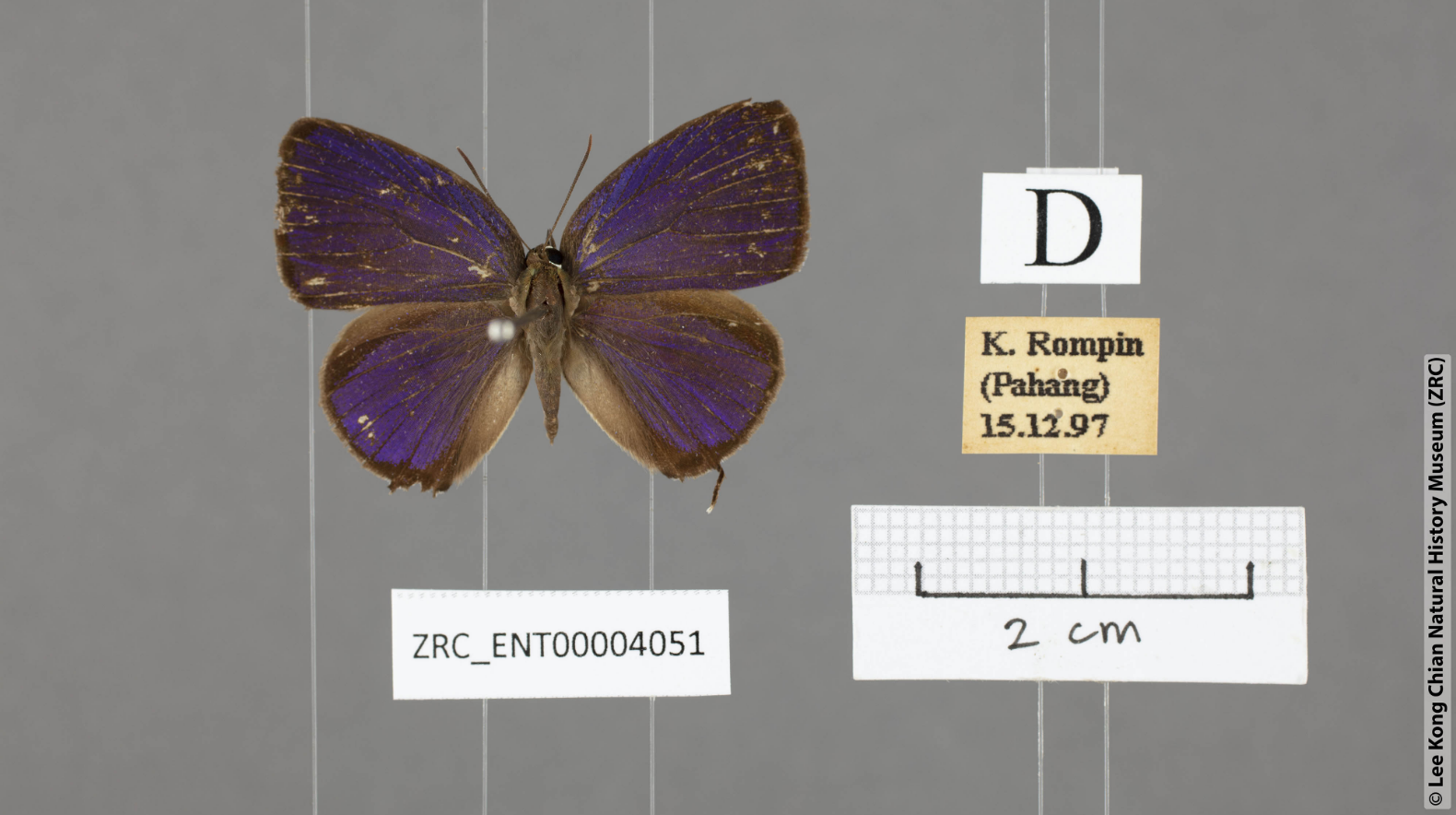
- Upperside
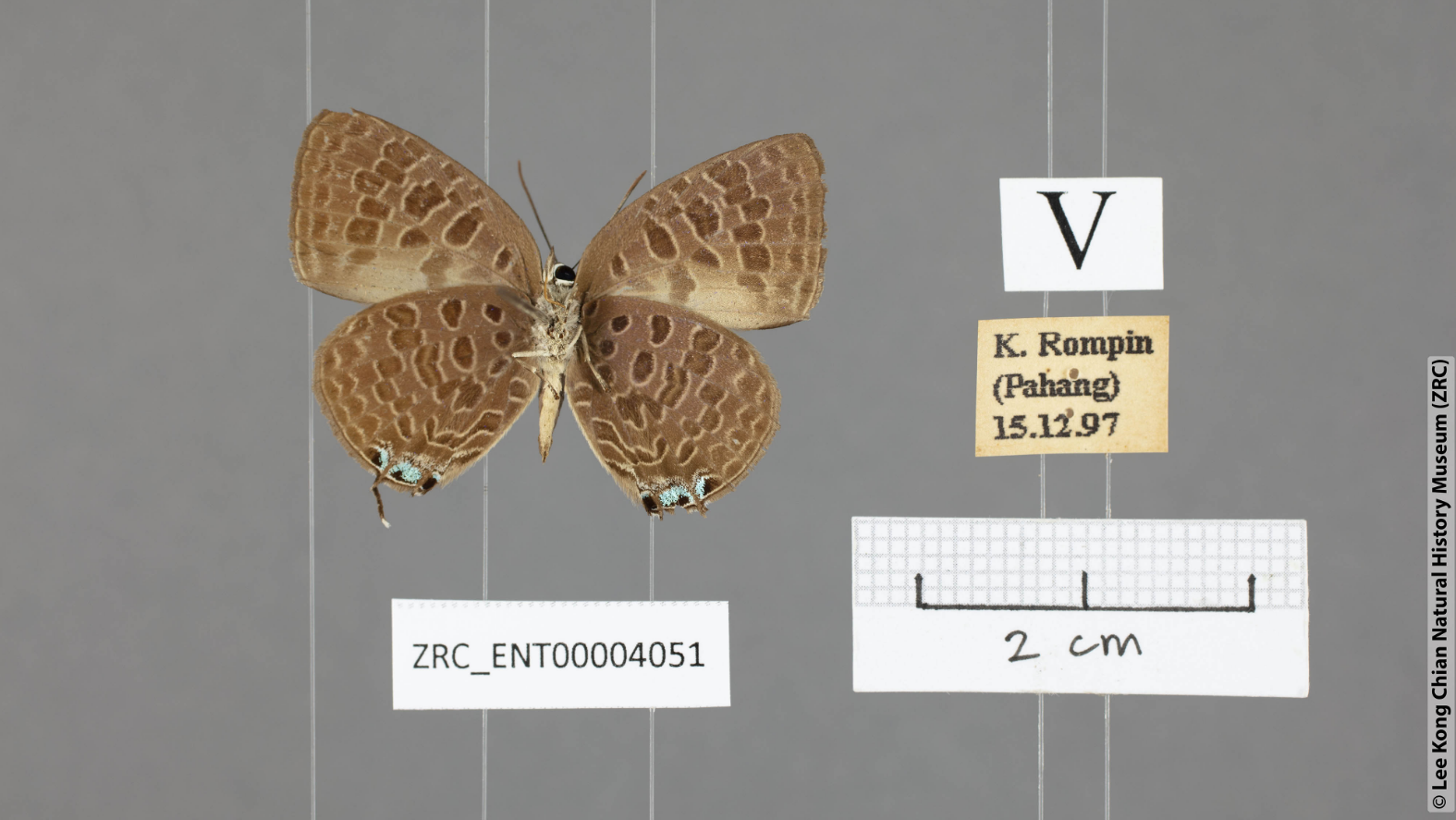
- Underside

Scientific classification
- Kingdom: Animalia
- Phylum: Arthropoda
- Class: Insecta
- Order: Lepidoptera
- Family: Lycaenidae
- Subfamily: Theclinae
- Tribe: Arhopalini
- Genus: Arhopala
- Species: A. sintanga

Binomial name
- Arhopala sintanga Corbet, 1948

Synonyms
- Narathura sintanga

= Arhopala sintanga =

Species of butterfly

Arhopala sintanga is a butterfly in the family Lycaenidae. It was described by Alexander Steven Corbet in 1948. It is found in Borneo and Malaysia.

== Description ==
The females are dark blue on the upperside with a border of 0.5 millimeters. The male is similar, but it is purple-blue on the upperside. Both sexes are brown on the underside.

== Subspecies ==
Two subspecies are recognized -

- Arhopala sintanga sintanga (Corbet, 1948) - Borneo
- Arhopala sintanga tani (Eliot, 1992) - Malaysia
