= Gouna vittigera =

Scientific classification
- Kingdom: Animalia
- Phylum: Arthropoda
- Class: Insecta
- Order: Coleoptera
- Suborder: Polyphaga
- Infraorder: Scarabaeiformia
- Family: Scarabaeidae
- Genus: Gouna
- Species: G. vittigera

Binomial name
- Gouna vittigera (Burmeister, 1844)

Synonyms
- Gymnoloma vittigera Burmeister, 1844

Species of beetle

Gouna vittigera is a species of beetle of the family Scarabaeidae. It is found in South Africa (Cape).

== Description ==
Adults reach a length of about 7 mm (0.28 in). They are similar to Gouna lineolata, but covered everywhere with regularly disposed scales. The pronotum is black, white on the sides and has two bands projecting from the black base to the limit of the scales, the median line is whiter and deeper. The scutellum is scaly and the elytra have four longitudinal white bands, the two near the suture broader and longer than the other two which are narrower and shorter. Between the two juxta-sutural bands and the suture there is a sprinkling of white scales. The legs are black.
