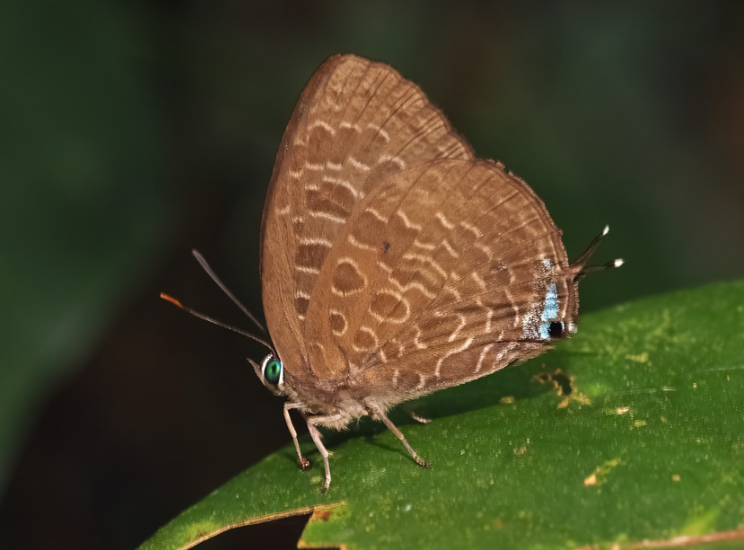
- subspecies unda

Scientific classification
- Kingdom: Animalia
- Phylum: Arthropoda
- Clade: Pancrustacea
- Class: Insecta
- Order: Lepidoptera
- Family: Lycaenidae
- Subfamily: Theclinae
- Tribe: Arhopalini
- Genus: Arhopala
- Species: A. overdijkinki

Binomial name
- Arhopala overdijkinki Corbet, 1941

Synonyms
- Narathura overdijkinki

= Arhopala overdijkinki =

Species of butterfly

Arhopala overdijkinki is a butterfly in the family Lycaenidae. It was described by Alexander Steven Corbet in 1941. It is found in the Indomalayan realm.

== Description ==
The male is a shining dark violet color and has a broad border. The female is similar to the male but is more brightly colored.

== Subspecies ==
Two subspecies are recognized:

- Arhopala overdijkinki overdijkinki (Corbet, 1941) - Java
- Arhopala overdijkinki unda (Evans, 1957) - West Malaysia
