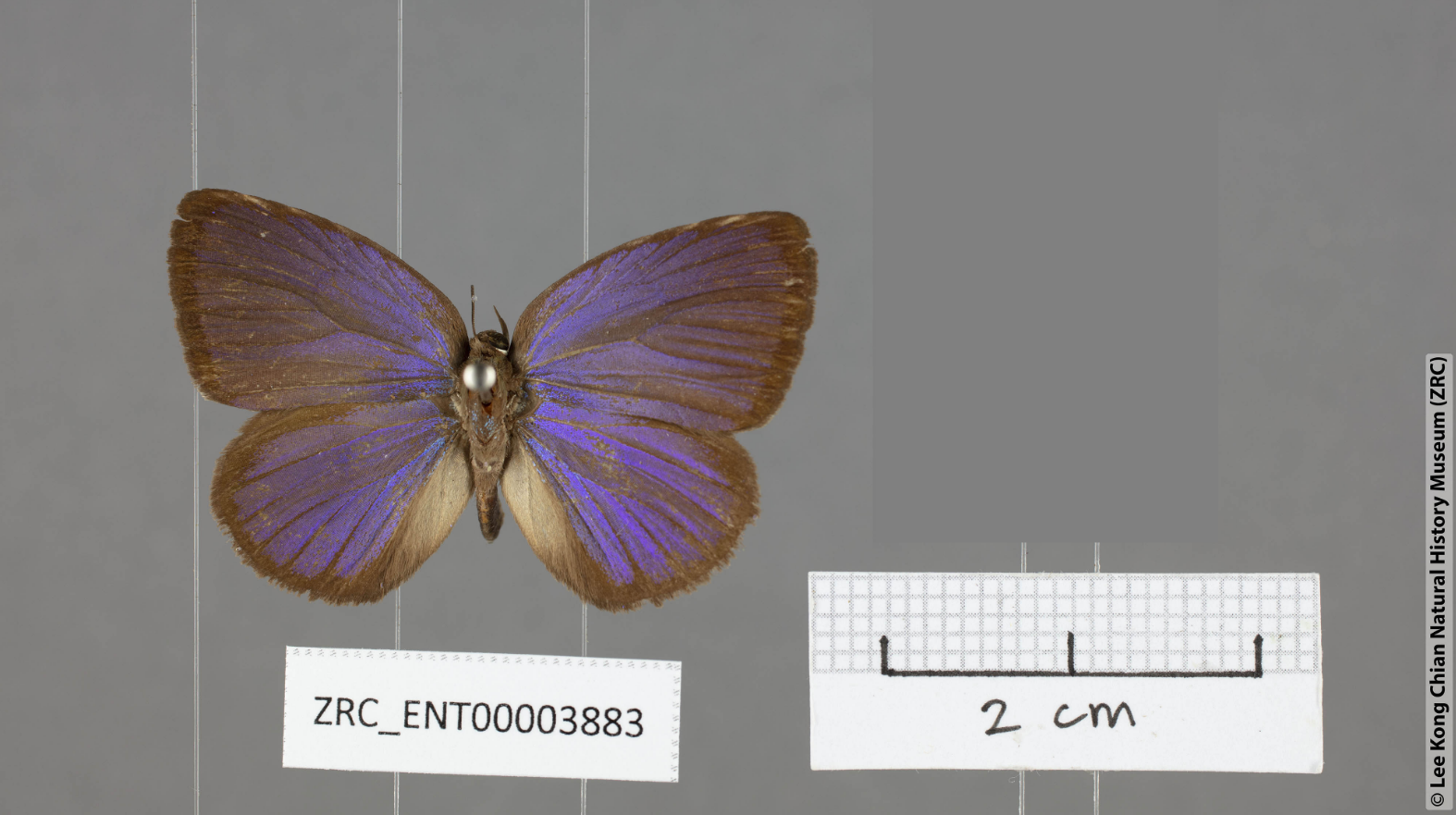
- Upperside
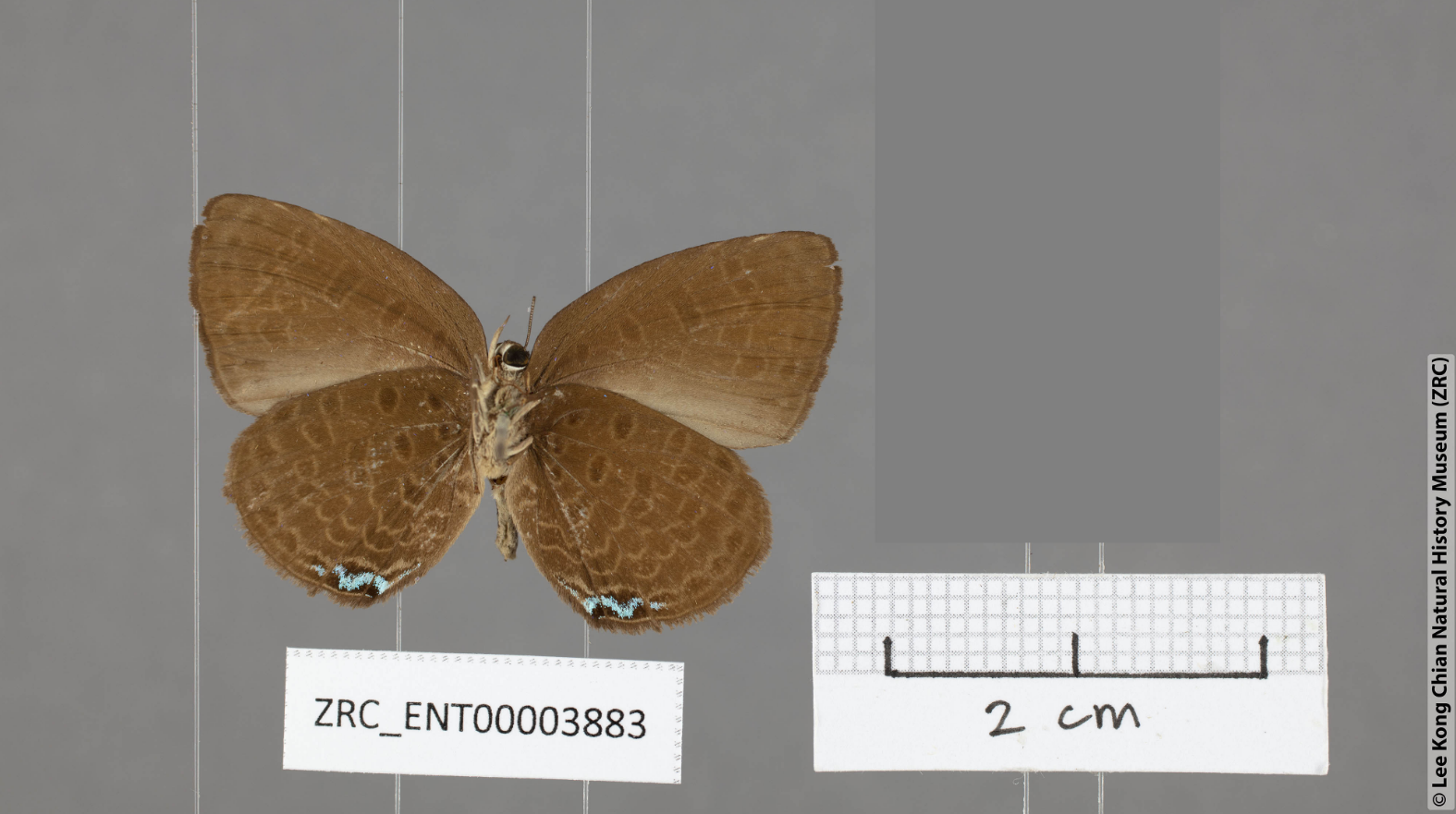
- Underside

Scientific classification
- Kingdom: Animalia
- Phylum: Arthropoda
- Class: Insecta
- Order: Lepidoptera
- Family: Lycaenidae
- Subfamily: Theclinae
- Tribe: Arhopalini
- Genus: Arhopala
- Species: A. avathina

Binomial name
- Arhopala avathina Corbet, 1941

Synonyms
- Narathura avathina

= Arhopala avathina =

Species of butterfly

Arhopala avathina, the lunulate yellow oakblue, is a butterfly in the family Lycaenidae. It was discovered by Alexander Steven Corbet in 1941. It is found in Peninsular Malaysia and Indonesia.

== Description ==
It is bright shining blue above, with a one-and-a-half-millimeter border. Subspecies avathina is bluer while neon is more purple.

== Subspecies ==
Three subspecies are recognized:

- Arhopala avathina neon (Corbet, 1941) - Sumatra
- Arhopala avathina xenon (Corbet, 1941) - Pulau Laut
- Arhopala avathina avathina (Evans, 1957) - Malay Peninsula (Note: Evans considers subspecies xenon as the synonym of subspecies neon.)
