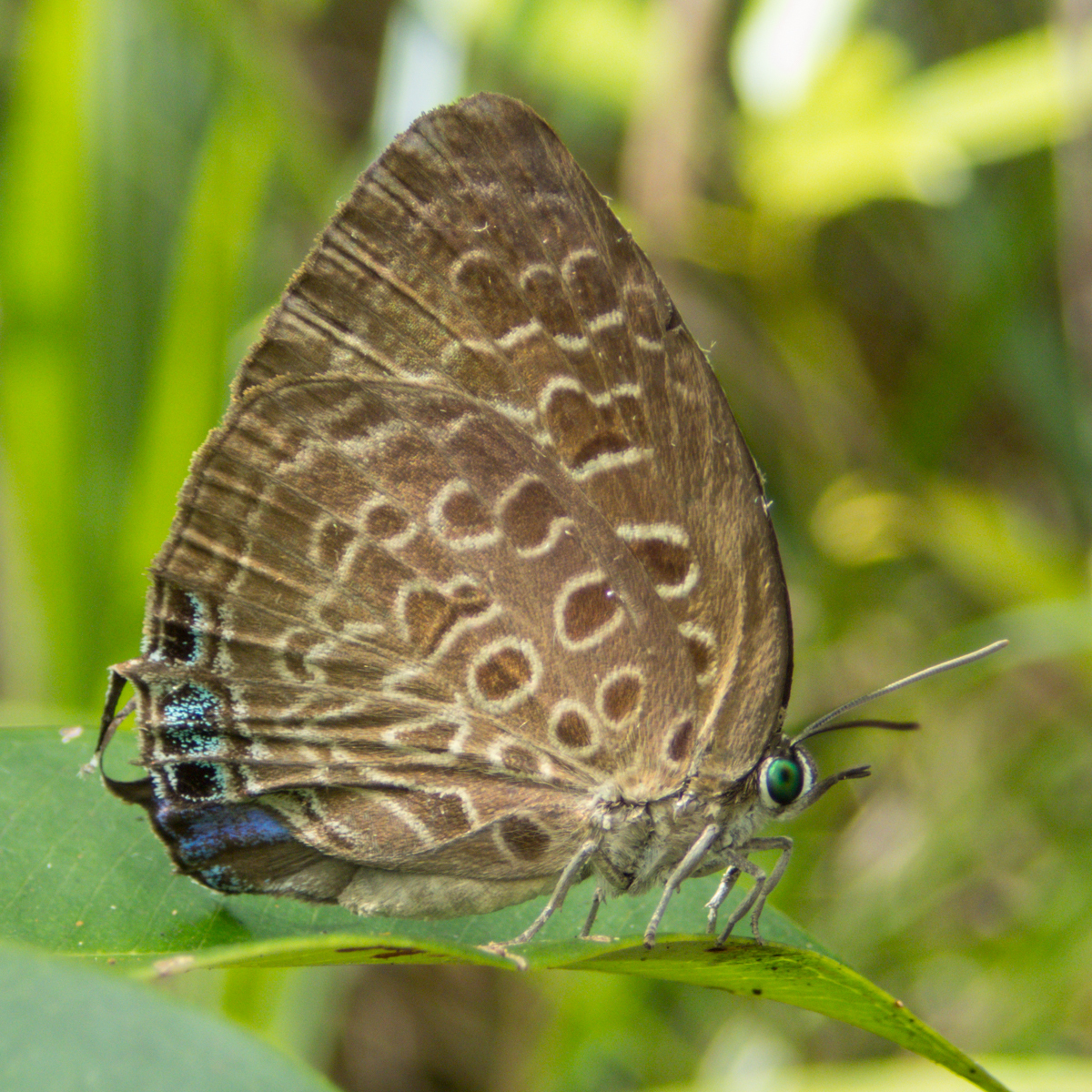

Scientific classification
- Kingdom: Animalia
- Phylum: Arthropoda
- Class: Insecta
- Order: Lepidoptera
- Family: Lycaenidae
- Subfamily: Theclinae
- Tribe: Arhopalini
- Genus: Arhopala
- Species: A. camdana

Binomial name
- Arhopala camdana Corbet, 1941

Synonyms
- Narathura semperi camdana

= Arhopala camdana =

Moonstone oakblue

Species of butterfly

Arhopala camdana, the moonstone oakblue, is a butterfly in the family Lycaenidae. It was described by Alexander Steven Corbet in 1941. It is found in Cambodia, Thailand and Malaysia.

== Description ==
It has a purple upper side with about 1.5 millimeters border length.

It is found in montane forests at moderate elevations.

== Subspecies ==
Three subspecies are recognized-

- Arhopala camdana camdana – West Malaysia
- Arhopala camdana arjuna
- Arhopala camdana kangeana
