= Çakmak Dam =

Çakmak Dam may refer to:

- Çakmak Dam (Samsun), a dam in Turkey
- Çakmak Dam (Edirne), a dam in Turkey
