= Gouna (beetle) =

Scientific classification
- Kingdom: Animalia
- Phylum: Arthropoda
- Clade: Pancrustacea
- Class: Insecta
- Order: Coleoptera
- Suborder: Polyphaga
- Infraorder: Scarabaeiformia
- Family: Scarabaeidae
- Subfamily: Melolonthinae
- Tribe: Hopliini
- Genus: Gouna; Péringuey, 1902

Genus of beetles

Gouna is a genus of monkey beetles in the family Scarabaeidae. These species are found in South Africa.

== Description ==
Members of the genus Gouna are relatively small, with adults less than 1 centimetre in length. Originally, for the two species first described, Péringuey, 1902 (p.861) emphasises white bands of scales on various parts, especially the pronotum and the elytra.

Gouna was placed in the "Gymnoloma genus group" by Dombrow, Colville & Bowie, 2022. These authors distinguished Gouna by their eight-segmented antenna, in contrast to others including the comparatively speciose genus Amblymelanoplia where the antennae is nine-segmented in nearly all species. From the remainder of Amblymelanoplia and other genera of the "Gymnoloma genus group", Gouna were further distinguished by their slender legs - especially the metathoracic (hind) femur, their metathoracic tibia with a spur, and notably that the elytra of Gouna have a squamose (scaly) pattern.

== Species ==
As of November 2025 these 3 species belong to the genus Gouna :

- Gouna aliena Péringuey, 1902 – South Africa
- Gouna lineolata (Burmeister, 1844) – South Africa
- Gouna vittigera (Burmeister, 1844) – South Africa

== Taxonomy ==
Another former species Gouna burchelli Arrow, 1917 was revised as Amblymelanoplia burchelli (Arrow, 1917) in a part of an extensive study where some of the original specimens were also then assigned to other species. The genus Gouna was again recognised as valid by Allsopp & Schoolmeesters, 2024.
