= Winter-over syndrome =

Psychological condition related to the Antarctic or Arctic winter

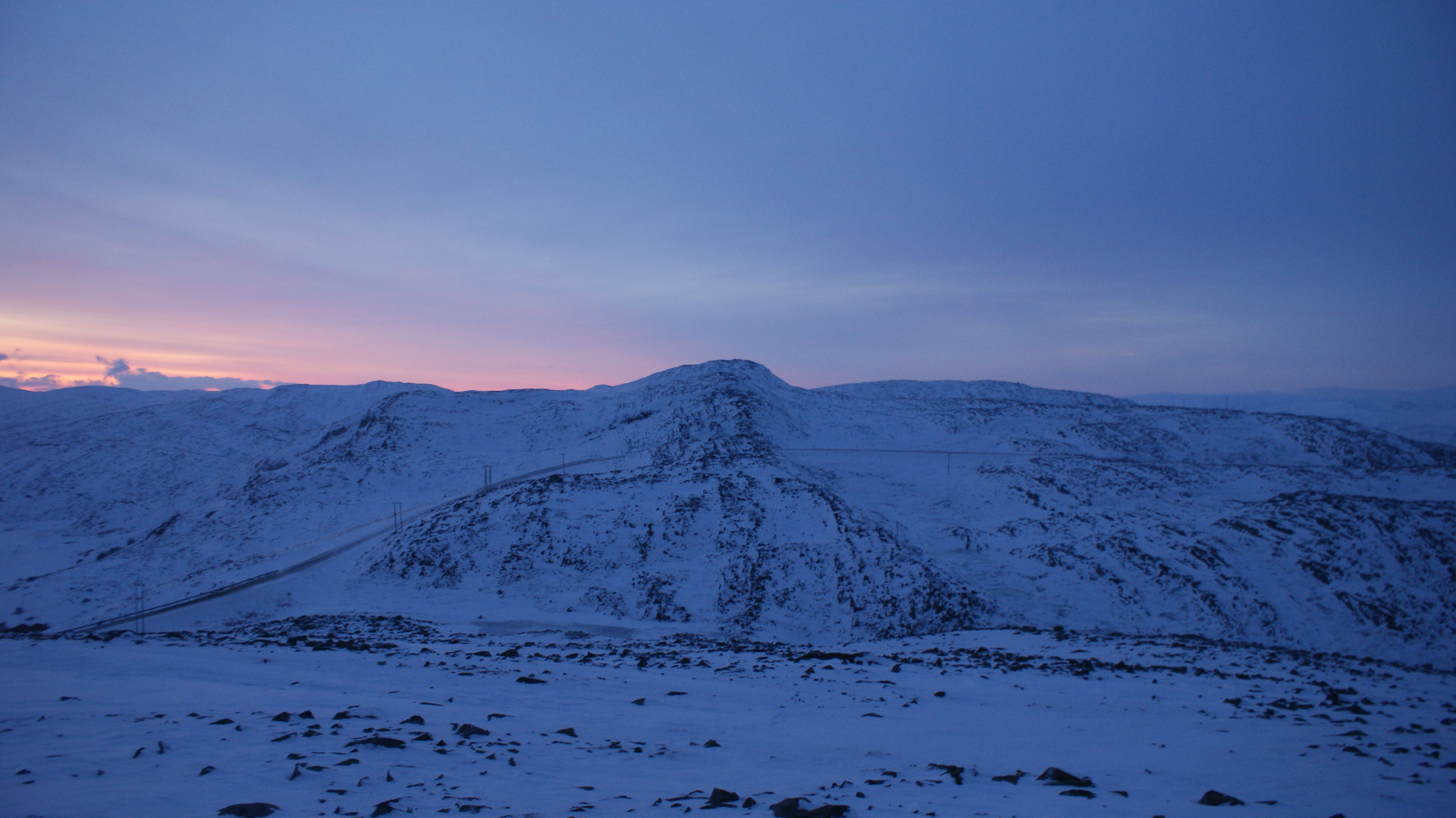
- Midday during a polar winter in Finnmark, Norway. Note that the sun has not fully risen.
- Symptoms: Depression, insomnia, hostility, anger/irritability, diminished cognitive performance, mild hypnotic states, irritable bowel syndrome
- Duration: 7-8 months (Polar winter)
- Causes: Psychological stresses and isolation at research stations in Antarctica and the Arctic in winter
- Treatment: End of winter and/or departure from polar regions

The winter-over syndrome is a condition that occurs in individuals who "winter over" throughout the Antarctic (or Arctic) winter, which can last seven to eight months. It has been observed in inhabitants of research stations in Antarctica, as well as in polar bases such as Thule, Alert and Eureka. It consists of a variety of behavioral and medical disturbances, including irritability, depression, insomnia, absentmindedness, aggressive behavior, and irritable bowel syndrome.

== Contributing factors ==
The Antarctic winter is a period of little to no sunlight, no physical contact with other continents or Antarctic stations, including no airplanes, ships, or mail. The area has the driest desert climate on Earth and low air pressure. It is completely cut off during winter, with a mean temperature of −51 °C (−60 °F), and the lowest recorded temperature is −85 °C (−121 °F). For these reasons, the immobility, monotony, harsh physical environment, sexual deprivation, and the general isolation are believed to contribute to increased anxiety and depression among the residents of Antarctic stations.

Several studies have been done over the years to determine the contributing causes, or stresses, of "winter-over" syndrome. These include stress, social isolation, subsyndromal seasonal affective disorder and polar T_{3} syndrome. The cold, danger, and hardships do not appear to be major stresses. The most important psychological stresses appear to be the problems of individual adjustment to the group, the relative monotony of the environment, and the absence of certain accustomed sources of emotional satisfaction. In addition to isolation from the outside world, there is confinement or a lack of isolation within the research stations themselves. During field work conducted at the McMurdo and South Pole stations in 1988 and 1989, informants complained that the lack of privacy and constant gossip within the community had a negative influence on social relationships, especially between men and women. As a result, 60% of one's leisure time is spent alone in a dorm room, whereas others are forced to work and live in confined spaces due to the nature of their work.

== Symptoms ==
While research around the winter-over syndrome dates back to the 1950s, there is no set of exclusive indicators that can typically reveal a diagnosis of the same. "Our analyses of the human experience in Antarctica suggest that there are few, if any, traits that serve as useful predictors of performance during the austral winter," Palinkas wrote in a paper called "The Psychology of Antarctic Research." Some of the symptoms included depression, insomnia, anger or irritability, feelings of hostility towards those around you, diminished cognitive performance including difficulty in concentration and memory, absentmindedness, and the occurrence of mild hypnotic states known as 'long-eye' or the 'Antarctic stare'.

Bill Spindler, documenting his extensive research on the Antarctic, attributes the effects of sensory deprivation, isolation, and maybe even the effect of extreme cold on the thyroid gland which can cause memory loss, sleepiness or sluggishness.

== See also ==
- Telecommunications in Antarctica
- Island fever – Effect on people who move to islands
- Polar night – Phenomenon where the Sun remains below the horizon for more than 24 hours
- Seasonal affective disorder
- Psychological and sociological effects of spaceflight
- MARS-500 – Psychosocial isolation experiment in spaceflight research
