= Gouna aliena =

Scientific classification
- Kingdom: Animalia
- Phylum: Arthropoda
- Class: Insecta
- Order: Coleoptera
- Suborder: Polyphaga
- Infraorder: Scarabaeiformia
- Family: Scarabaeidae
- Genus: Gouna
- Species: G. aliena

Binomial name
- Gouna aliena Péringuey, 1902

Species of beetle

Gouna aliena is a species of beetle of the family Scarabaeidae. It is found in South Africa (Eastern Cape).

== Description ==
Adults reach a length of about 6 mm (0.24 in). They are black and sub-opaque, with the head, pronotum and elytra closely scabroso-punctate and covered with very short, sub-appressed greyish hairs and greyish-white elongate scales, which are numerous on the head, and on the pronotum form a median line, a supra-lateral band, usually interrupted in the middle, and an entire marginal one, as well as a supra-marginal, lateral, median patch. The scutellum is not densely scaly and the elytra have a very faint, dorsal, longitudinal, raised line, and on each side a juxta-sutural band of white scales, and a much shorter one along the humeral callus. The edge of the propygidium is scaly, the pygidium is clothed with not closely set, appressed greyish, squamose hairs, but the abdomen and the whole pectus are covered with large, conspicuous, silver-white scales. The legs have squamose whitish appressed hairs.
