= Anne Chao =

Taiwanese environmental statistician

Lien-Ju Chao
- 趙蓮菊
- Born: Lien-Ju Chao c. 1950 (age c. 74)
- Education: National Tsing Hua University (BS); University of Wisconsin–Madison (PhD)
- Notable work: Diversity Analysis, Statistical Estimation of Biodiversity Indices
- Title: Tsing Hua Distinguished Chair Professor
- Scientific career
- Fields: Environmental statistics
- Workplaces: National Tsing Hua University
- Thesis: The Quadrature Method in Inference Problems Arising From the Generalized Multinomial Distribution (1977)
- Doctoral advisor: Bernard Harris

Lien-Ju Anne Chao (Chinese: 趙蓮菊; born c. 1950) is a Taiwanese environmental statistician. She is the Tsing Hua Distinguished Chair Professor of Statistics and a former Taiwan National Chair Professor at National Tsing Hua University. She is known for her work on mark and recapture methods for estimating the size and diversity of populations. The Chao1 and Chao2 estimators of species richness are named after her.

== Education and career ==
Chao graduated from National Tsing Hua University with a Bachelor of Science (B.S.) in mathematics in 1973. She then pursued doctoral studies in the United States, earning her Ph.D. in statistics in 1977 from the University of Wisconsin–Madison. Her dissertation, supervised by Bernard Harris, was The Quadrature Method in Inference Problems Arising From the Generalized Multinomial Distribution.

After working for a year as a visiting assistant professor at the University of Michigan, she returned to National Tsing Hua University as a faculty member in 1978. She was Taiwan National Chair Professor there from 2005 to 2008, and became Tsing Hua Distinguished Chair Professor in 2006.

With Lou Jost, Chao is the author of Diversity Analysis (Taylor & Francis, 2008; Chapman & Hall, 2017). She is also the author of Statistical Estimation of Biodiversity Indices (Wiley, 2017) with Chun-Huo Chiu and Jost.

Chao was elected as a fellow of the Institute of Mathematical Statistics in 1997. She is also an elected member of the International Statistical Institute. Chao has described herself as "60% statistician, 30% mathematician and 10% ecologist".
