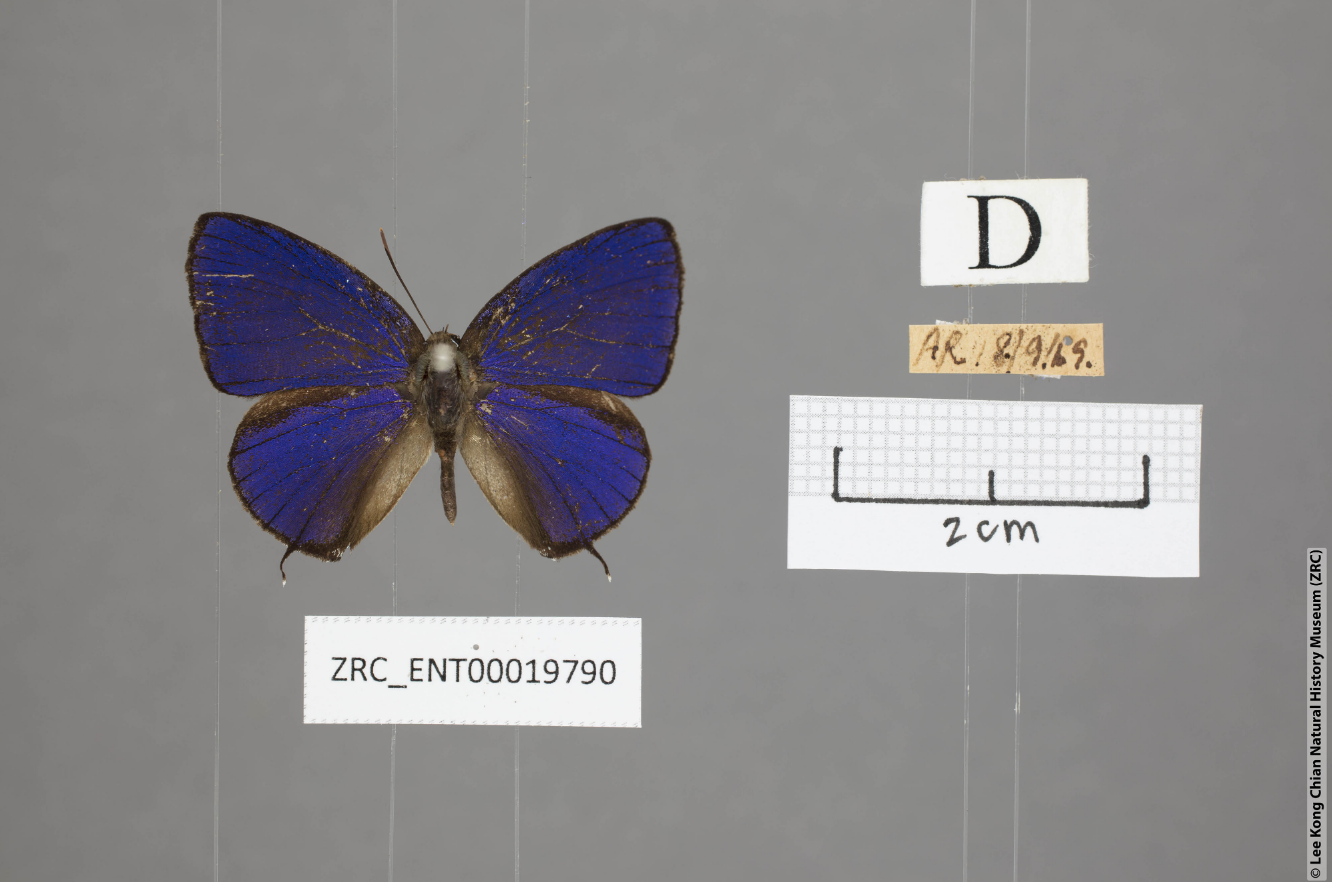
- Upperside (subspecies phanda)
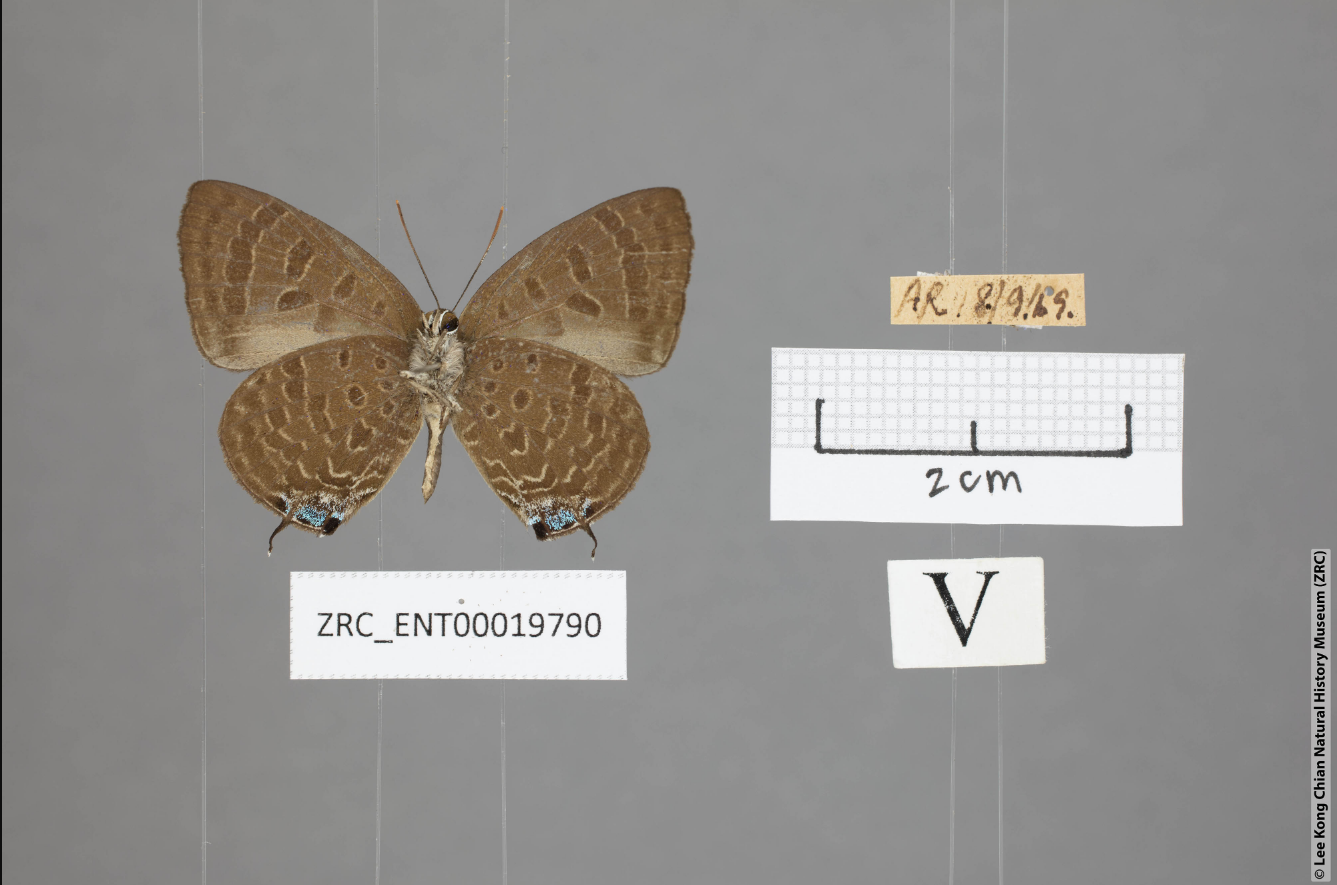
- Underside (subspecies phanda)

Scientific classification
- Kingdom: Animalia
- Phylum: Arthropoda
- Class: Insecta
- Order: Lepidoptera
- Family: Lycaenidae
- Genus: Arhopala
- Species: A. phanda

Binomial name
- Arhopala phanda Corbet, 1903

Synonyms
- Narathura sublustris phanda

= Arhopala phanda =

Species of butterfly

Arhopala phanda is a butterfly in the family Lycaenidae. It was discovered by Alexander Steven Corbet in 1941. It is found in West Malaysia and Borneo.

== Description ==
The female is dark purple blue above, with a border of 0.5 millimeters. The underside is similar to that of most Arhopala butterflies.

== Subspecies ==
Two subspecies are recognized-

- Arhopala phanda phanda (Corbet, 1941) - West Malaysia
- Arhopala phanda sibatika (Eliot, 1972) - Borneo
