= Rock fever =

Effect on people who move to islands

Rock fever and island fever are colloquial terms for a form of mental distress said to mainly afflict mainlanders who move to isolated islands, especially any of the Hawaiian islands or Guam. It is neither a medical term nor a classification, and it has not been the focus of any serious research. It has been described as "an ailment" of feeling "stifled by [the island's] size and isolation", making its sufferers "anxious, irritated, desperate, and claustrophobic." It is often ascribed to homesickness. Rock fever has also been described as a feeling of isolation that could arise in any isolated place and affect anyone, including native inhabitants.

== See also ==
- Winter-over syndrome
