= Çakmak Dam (Samsun) =

- Location within Turkey
- Interactive map of Çakmak Dam
- Location: Turkey
- Coordinates: 41°06′35″N 36°38′01″E

Çakmak Dam is a dam in Samsun Province, Turkey. Its reservoir has been found to house Capoeta tinca, a species of scraper, as well as 136 recorded taxa of phytoplankton, with members of the phylum Chlorophyta dominant in population density, and Bacillariophyta dominant in terms of species richness. The dam is a source of water for the city of Samsun.

== See also ==
- List of dams and reservoirs in Turkey
