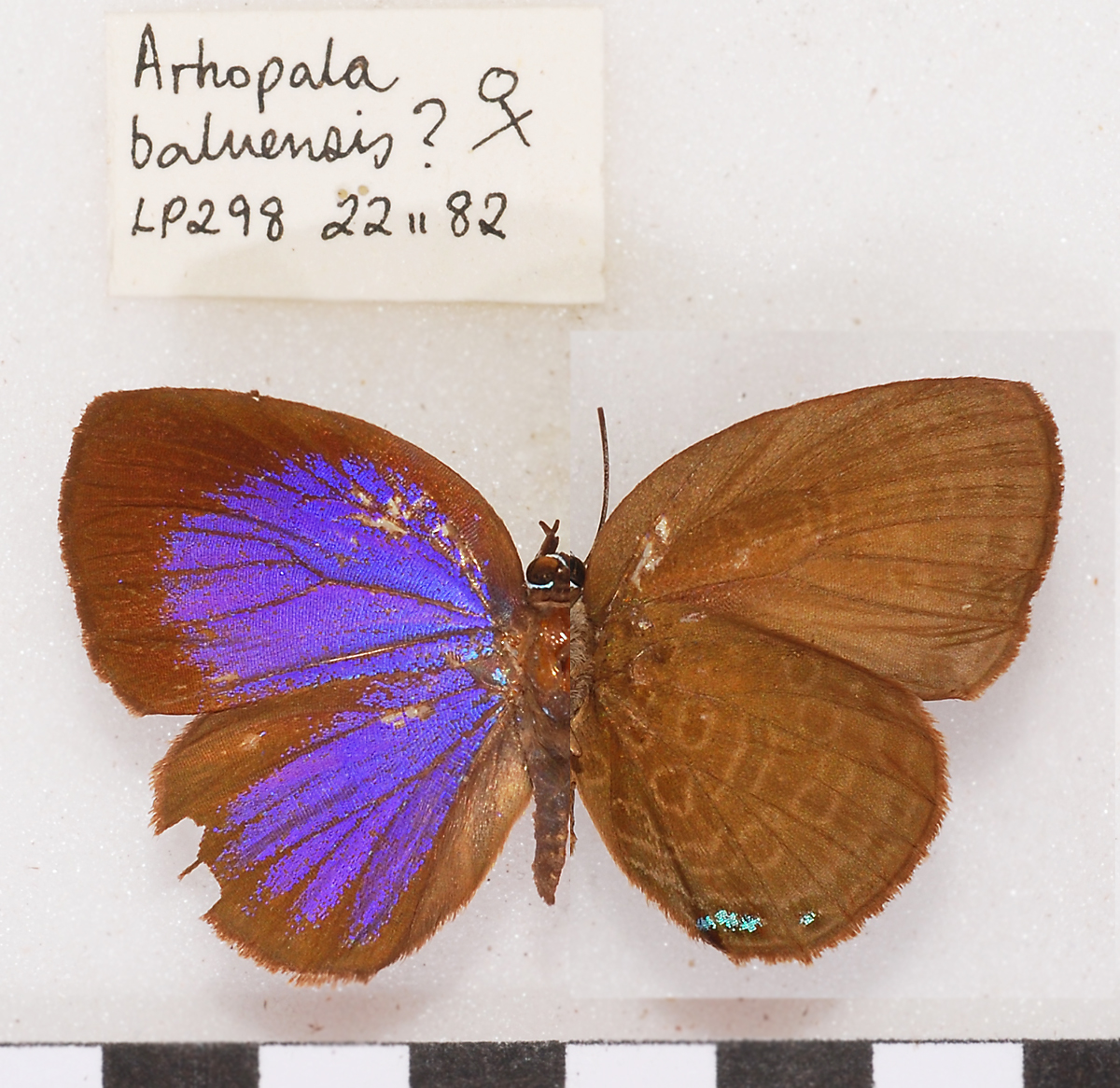

Scientific classification
- Kingdom: Animalia
- Phylum: Arthropoda
- Clade: Pancrustacea
- Class: Insecta
- Order: Lepidoptera
- Family: Lycaenidae
- Genus: Arhopala
- Species: A. baluensis

Binomial name
- Arhopala baluensis Bethune-Baker, 1904

= Arhopala baluensis =

Species of butterfly

Arhopala baluensis is a butterfly in the family Lycaenidae. It was described by George Thomas Bethune-Baker in 1904. It is found in the Indomalayan realm (Borneo).

The male is dark blue with a dark border 1/mm wide. The female is shining purple-blue, border 3 mm. at apex to I or 2 mm. at dorsum and on the hindwing.
