= Species–area relationship =

Biodiversity ratio in ecology

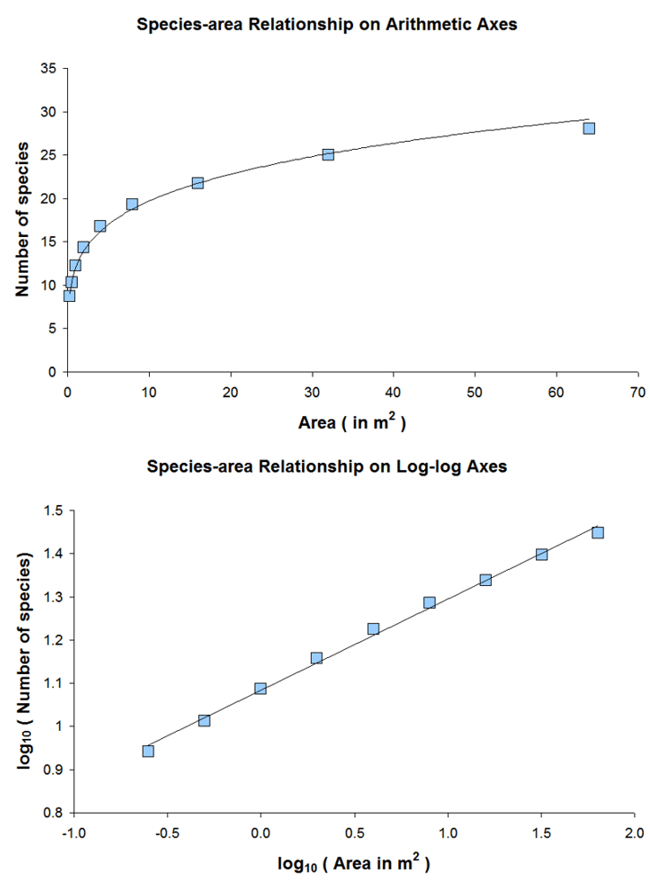
The species–area relationship for a contiguous habitat

The species–area relationship or species–area curve describes the relationship between the area of a habitat, or of part of a habitat, and the number of species found within that area. Larger areas tend to contain larger numbers of species, and empirically, the relative numbers seem to follow systematic mathematical relationships. The species–area relationship is usually constructed for a single type of organism, such as all vascular plants or all species of a specific trophic level within a particular site. It is rarely if ever, constructed for all types of organisms if simply because of the prodigious data requirements. It is related but not identical to the species discovery curve.

Ecologists have proposed a wide range of factors determining the slope and elevation of the species–area relationship. These factors include the relative balance between immigration and extinction, rate and magnitude of disturbance on small vs. large areas, predator-prey dynamics, and clustering of individuals of the same species as a result of dispersal limitation or habitat heterogeneity. The species–area relationship has been reputed to follow from the 2nd law of thermodynamics. In contrast to these "mechanistic" explanations, others assert the need to test whether the pattern is simply the result of a random sampling process. Species–area relationships are often evaluated in conservation science in order to predict extinction rates in the case of habitat loss and habitat fragmentation.

Authors have classified the species–area relationship according to the type of habitats being sampled and the census design used. Frank W. Preston, an early investigator of the theory of the species–area relationship, divided it into two types: samples (a census of a contiguous habitat that grows in the census area, also called "mainland" species–area relationships), and isolates (a census of discontiguous habitats, such as islands, also called "island" species–area relationships). Michael Rosenzweig also notes that species–area relationships for very large areas—those collecting different biogeographic provinces or continents—behave differently from species–area relationships from islands or smaller contiguous areas. It has been presumed that "island"-like species–area relationships have steeper slopes (in log–log space) than "mainland" relationships, but a 2006 metaanalysis of almost 700 species–area relationships found the former had lower slopes than the latter.

Regardless of census design and habitat type, species–area relationships are often fitted with a simple function. Frank Preston advocated the power function based on his investigation of the lognormal species-abundance distribution. If $S$ is the number of species, $A$ is the habitat area, and $z$ is the slope of the species area relationship in log-log space, then the power function species–area relationship goes as:

$$S = cA^z$$

Here $c$ is a constant which depends on the unit used for area measurement, and equals the number of species that would exist if the habitat area was confined to one square unit. The graph looks like a straight line on log–log axes, and can be linearized as:

$$\log(S) = \log(cA^z) = \log(c) + z \log(A)$$

In contrast, Henry Gleason championed the semilog model:

$$S = \log(cA^z) = \log(c) + z \log(A)$$

which looks like a straight line on semilog axes, where the area is logged and the number of species is arithmetic. In either case, the species–area relationship is almost always decelerating (has a negative second derivative) when plotted arithmetically.

Species–area relationships are often graphed for islands (or habitats that are otherwise isolated from one another, such as woodlots in an agricultural landscape) of different sizes. Although larger islands tend to have more species, a smaller island may have more than a larger one. In contrast, species–area relationships for contiguous habitats will always rise as area increases, provided that the sample plots are nested within one another.

The species–area relationship for mainland areas (contiguous habitats) will differ according to the census design used to construct it. A common method is to use quadrats of successively larger size so that the area enclosed by each one includes the area enclosed by the smaller ones (i.e. areas are nested).

In the first part of the 20th century, plant ecologists often used the species–area curve to estimate the minimum size of a quadrat necessary to adequately characterize a community. This is done by plotting the curve (usually on arithmetic axes, not log-log or semilog axes), and estimating the area after which using larger quadrats results in the addition of only a few more species. This is called the minimal area. A quadrat that encloses the minimal area is called a relevé, and using species–area curves in this way is called the relevé method. It was largely developed by the Swiss ecologist Josias Braun-Blanquet.

Estimation of the minimal area from the curve is necessarily subjective, so some authors prefer to define the minimal area as the area enclosing at least 95 percent (or some other large proportion) of the total species found. The problem with this is that the species area curve does not usually approach an asymptote, so it is not obvious what should be taken as the total. the number of species always increases with area up to the point where the area of the entire world has been accumulated.

== See also ==
- Scaling pattern of occupancy
- Species richness
- Storage effect
- Unified neutral theory of biodiversity (UNTB)
