= Gouna lineolata =

Scientific classification
- Kingdom: Animalia
- Phylum: Arthropoda
- Class: Insecta
- Order: Coleoptera
- Suborder: Polyphaga
- Infraorder: Scarabaeiformia
- Family: Scarabaeidae
- Genus: Gouna
- Species: G. lineolata

Binomial name
- Gouna lineolata (Burmeister, 1844)

Synonyms
- Gymnoloma lineolata Burmeister, 1844; Gymnoloma lineata Péringuey, 1902

Species of beetle

Gouna lineolata is a species of beetle of the family Scarabaeidae. It is found in South Africa (Western Cape).

== Description ==
Adults reach a length of about 6.5–7 mm (0.26–0.28 in). They are black. The head, pronotum and elytra are very closely punctate, with the punctures scabrose and partly hidden by a very short, sub-appressed, slightly flavescent pubescence. The pronotum has a narrow median line and a supra-lateral one of white scales, and the outer margin is moderately broadly banded with similar ones. The scutellum is densely squamose and the elytra have a discoidal band of white scales beginning close to the base but barely reaching the median part, and a juxta-sutural one slightly shorter than the discoidal, beginning at about the median part, and obliterated at a good distance from the apex. The propygidium, abdomen, and pectus are clothed with dense silvery-white scales and the pygidium is closely punctured, not scaly or hairy.
