= Species richness =

Variety of species in an ecological community, landscape or region

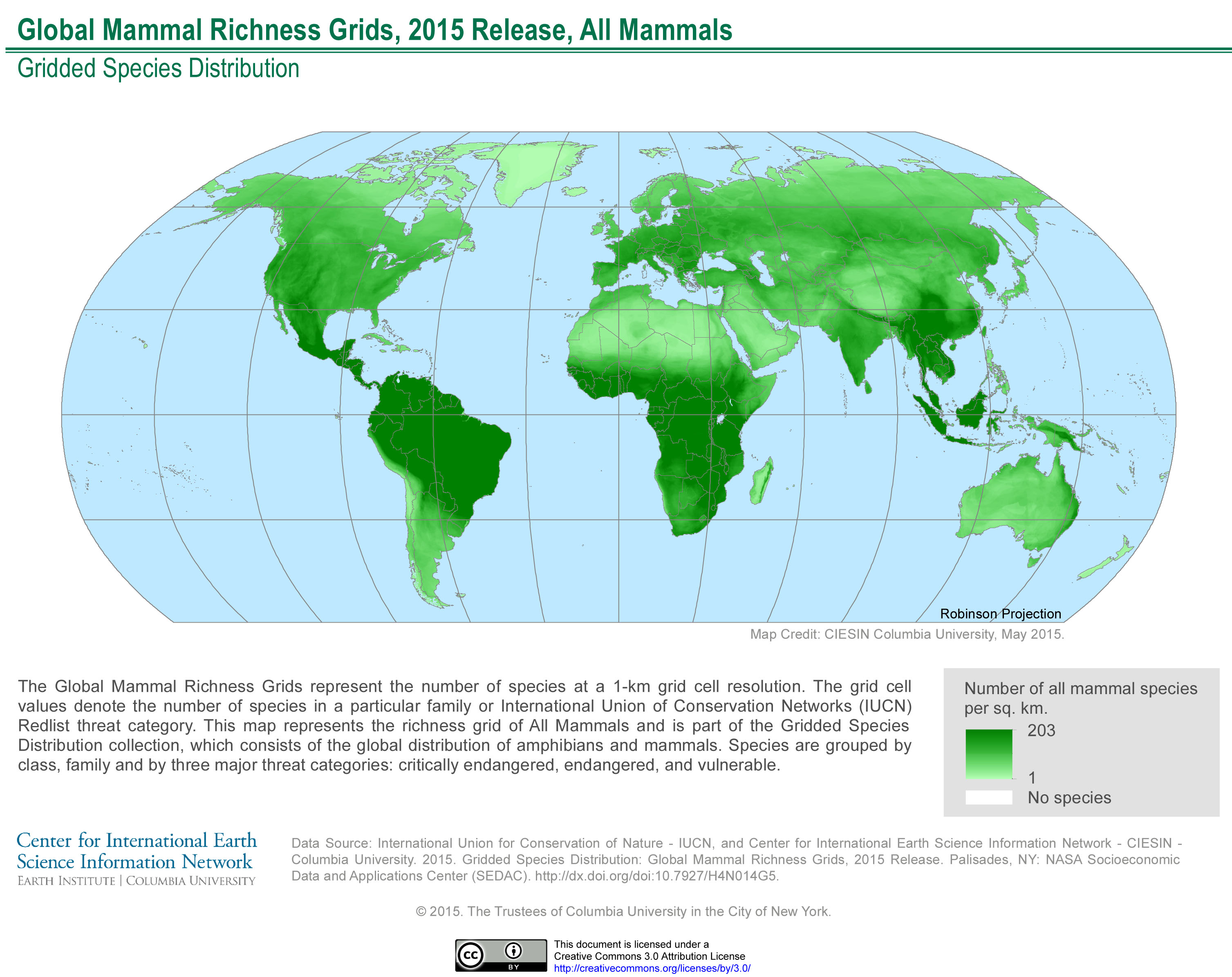
Global mammal richness (2015)

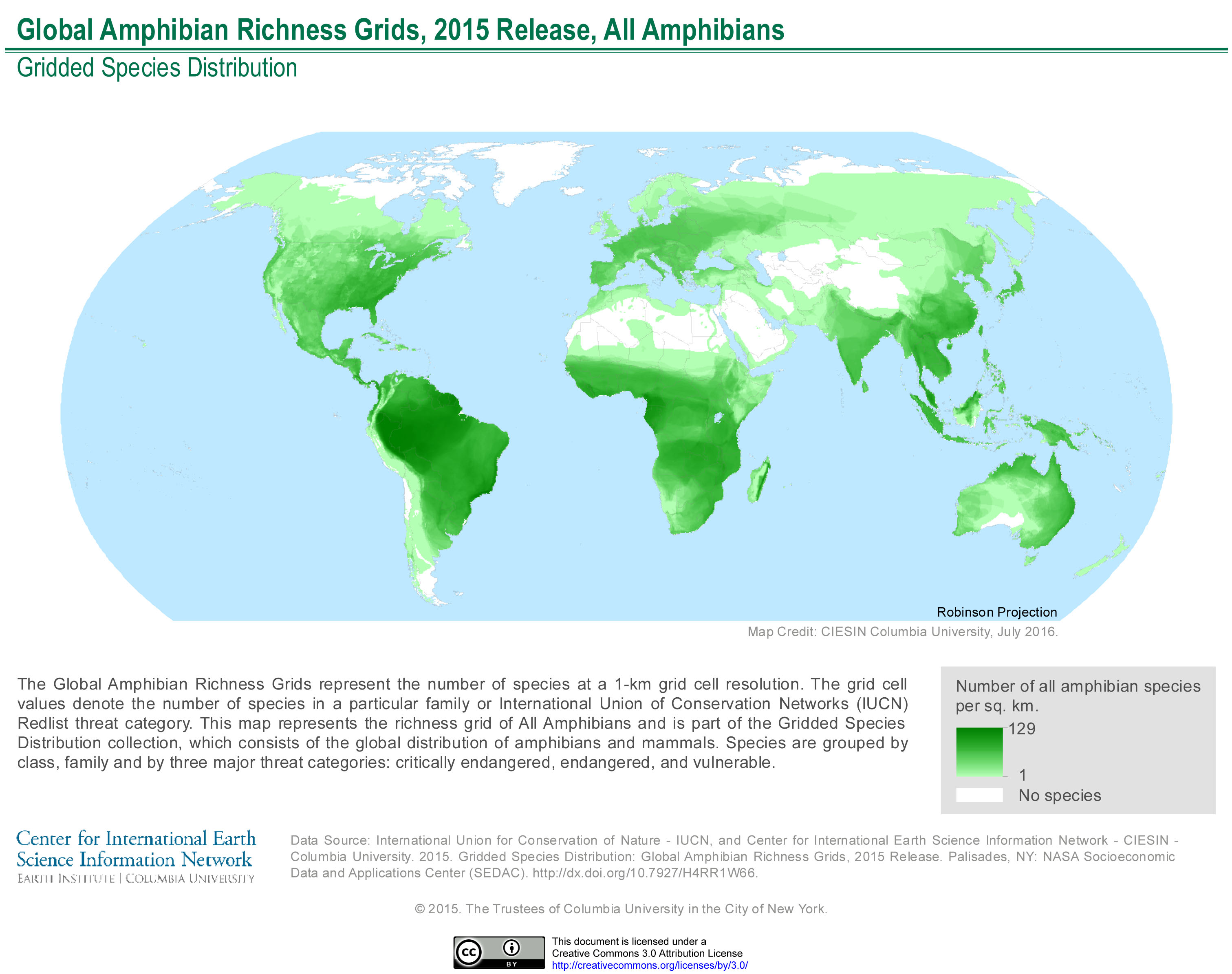
Global amphibian richness (2015)

Species richness is the number of different species represented in an ecological community, landscape, or region. Species richness is simply a count of species, and it does not take into account the abundance of each species or its abundance relative to other species (known as relative species abundance). Species richness and species diversity are sometimes erroneously used as synonyms, but species diversity is a scientific assessment of both species richness and species evenness.

== Sampling considerations ==
Depending on the purposes of quantifying species richness, the individuals can be selected in different ways. They can be, for example, trees found in an inventory plot, birds observed from a monitoring point, or beetles collected in a pitfall trap. Once the set of individuals has been defined, its species richness can be exactly quantified, provided the species-level taxonomy of the organisms of interest is well enough known. Applying different species delimitations will lead to different species richness values for the same set of individuals.

In practice, people are usually interested in the species richness of areas so large that not all individuals in them can be observed and identified to species. Then applying different sampling methods will lead to different sets of individuals being observed for the same area of interest, and the species richness of each set may be different. When a new individual is added to a set, it may introduce a species that was not yet represented in the set, and thereby increase the species richness of the set. For this reason, sets with many individuals can be expected to contain more species than sets with fewer individuals.

If species richness of the obtained sample is taken to represent species richness of the underlying habitat or other larger unit, values are only comparable if sampling efforts are standardised in an appropriate way. Resampling methods can be used to bring samples of different sizes to a common footing. Properties of the sample, especially the number of species only represented by one or a few individuals, can be used to help estimating the species richness in the population from which the sample was drawn.

== Trends in species richness ==
The observed species richness is affected not only by the number of individuals but also by the heterogeneity of the sample. If individuals are drawn from different environmental conditions (or different habitats), the species richness of the resulting set can be expected to be higher than if all individuals are drawn from similar environments. The accumulation of new species with increasing sampling effort can be visualised with a species accumulation curve. Such curves can be constructed in different ways. Increasing the area sampled increases observed species richness both because more individuals get included in the sample and because large areas are environmentally more heterogeneous than small areas.

Many organism groups have most species in the tropics, which leads to latitudinal gradients in species richness. There has been much discussion about the relationship between productivity and species richness. Results have varied among studies, such that no global consensus on either the pattern or its possible causes has emerged.

== Applications ==
Species richness is often used as a criterion when assessing the relative conservation values of habitats or landscapes. However, species richness is blind to the identity of the species. An area with many endemic or rare species is generally considered to have higher conservation value than another area where species richness is similar, but all the species are common and widespread.

== See also ==
- Rapoport's rule
- Scaling pattern of occupancy
- Species-area curve
- Species discovery curve
- Storage effect
