= Alexander Steven Corbet =

British chemist, bacteriologist and entomologist (1896–1948)

- Born: 8 August 1896
- Died: 16 May 1948 (aged 51)
- Known for: Unseen species problem
- Children: Philip Steven Corbet; Sarah Alexandra Corbet

Alexander Steven Corbet (8 August 1896 – 16 May 1948) was a British chemist and naturalist.

He was educated at Bournemouth and the University of Reading where he received a PhD in inorganic chemistry. In the late 1920s he and his wife, Irene (nee Trewavas), moved to Kuala Lumpur where Alexander worked as a soil microbiologist for the Rubber Research Institute of Malaya. There he became an expert on Malaysian butterflies, co-authoring The Butterflies of the Malay Peninsula with H.M. Pendlebury in 1934. In 1931 he and his family returned to the UK and Alexander worked at the ICI research station at Jealotts Hill. He later became deputy keeper of entomology at the British Museum (Natural History).

The 1943 Ronald Fisher, Corbet, Williams paper on the unseen species problem in ecology was a key contribution in the field of community ecology, and remains important to this day.

Corbet had four children, two of which died in infancy. Both of his adult children acquired his interest in entomology: his son Philip Steven Corbet became an authority on dragonflies and his daughter Sarah Alexandra Corbet is an authority on British bumble bees and plant pollination.

Alexander Steven Corbet collapsed from heart failure after hurrying for a train, and died shortly after in 1948.

== See also ==
- Unseen species problem
