= Index of conservation articles =

This is an index of conservation topics. It is an alphabetical index of articles relating to conservation biology and conservation of the natural environment.

== A ==
- Abiotic stress - Adaptive management - Adventive plant - Aerial-seeding - Agreed Measures for the Conservation of Antarctic Fauna and Flora - Agroecology - American Prairie Foundation - Anti-whaling - Assisted migration - Assisted migration of forests in North America

== B ==
- Biodegradation - Biodiversity - Biodiversity action plan - Biodiversity hotspot - Biogenic - Biodiversity Outcomes Framework - Biogeographic realm - Biogeography - Bioinformatics - Biological integrity - Biomagnification - Biomaterial - Biome - Biomimicry - Biomonitoring - Biophilia hypothesis - Biophilic design - Biopiracy - Bioregion - Bioregionalism - Biosafety - Biosalinity - Biosecurity - Biosphere - Biosphere reserve - Biostatistics - Biosurvey - Biotechnology - Bioterrorism - Biotransference - Bird conservation - Blue-listed - Bottom trawling - Buffer zone

== C ==
- Captive breeding - Cave conservation - Charismatic megafauna - CITES - Common species - Community-based conservation - Compassionate conservation - Conference of Governors - Conservation agriculture - Conservation area - Conservation authority - Conservation biology - Conservation Commons - Conservation community - Conservation dependent - Conservation designation - Conservation development - Conservation easement - Conservation ethic - Conservation grazing - Conservation headland - Conservation land trust – Conservation management system - Conservation movement - Conservation of American bison - Conservation park - Conservation photography - Conservation psychology - Conservation-reliant species - Conservation status - Conservation welfare - Convention on Biological Diversity - COTES - Critically endangered species - Cross-boundary subsidy - Cross-fostering (conservation of resources)

== D ==
- Data deficient - Debt-for-nature swap - Deforestation

== E ==
- Ecoregion - Ecosystem restoration - Ecosystem services - Ecological crisis - Ecological island - Ecological niche - Ecological selection - Ecotone - Edge effect - Endangered species - Endangered species recovery plan - Endemic Bird Area - Endemism - Environmental stewardship - Evolutionarily Significant Unit - Extinction - Extinction event - Ex-situ conservation - Extinct in the wild - Extinction threshold

== F ==
- Flagship species - Forest fragmentation - Fortress conservation

== G ==
- Gaia theory - Gaia philosophy - Gaian - Game Warden - GPS Wildlife Tracking - GRANK - Gap analysis - Genetic pollution - Genetic erosion - Global strategy for plant conservation - Greenprinting

== H ==
- Habitat - Habitat fragmentation - Habitat conservation - Habitat destruction - Habitat fragmentation - Habitats Directive

== I ==
- Illegal logging - Important Bird Area - In-situ conservation - Index of biological integrity - Indianapolis Prize - Indigenous and community conserved area - The Institute for Bird Populations - Integrated Conservation and Development Project - Invader potential - Island restoration

== K ==
- Keystone species

== L ==
- Landscape-scale conservation - Lists of ecoregions by country - List of extinct birds - List of solar energy topics - List of threatened species of the Philippines - Local nature reserve - Logging - Latent extinction risk - Lower risk

== M ==
- Marine Protected Area - Marine conservation - Marine park - Marine reserve - Marxan - Millennium Seed Bank Partnership - Minimal impact code - Mission blue butterfly habitat conservation - Monarch butterfly conservation in California

== N ==
- National Cleanup Day - National Conservation Commission - National Conservation Exposition - National marine conservation area - National nature reserve - National park - NATURA 2000 - Natural heritage - Natural monument – Nature reserve - Nest box - North American Game Warden Museum

== O ==
- Old growth forest - Operation Wallacea

== P ==
- Penguin sweater - Pollinator decline - Protected area

== R ==
- Ramsar site - Rare species - Red-listed - Regional Forest Agreement - Regional Red List - Reforestation - Reintroduction - Resource management - Restoration ecology - Rewilding - Roadless area conservation

== S ==
- Scaling pattern of occupancy - Seedbank - Site based conservation - Site of Nature Conservation Interest - Site of Special Scientific Interest - Small population size - Soil salination - Soils retrogression and degradation - Solar air conditioning - Solar energy - Solar thermal energy - Shifting baseline syndrome - Soil conservation - Source-sink dynamics - Special Area of Conservation - Special Protection Area - Species richness - Species Survival Plan - Species of concern - Species translocation - Stewardship cessation Strict nature reserve - Subnational rank - Sustainability - Sustainable forest management - Sustainable habitat - Sustainable industries - Sustainable procurement - Sustainable seafood - Sustainable yield

== T ==
- Terraforming - Terrestrial ecoregion - The Nature Conservancy - 30 by 30 - Threatened species - Trail ethics - Translocation

== U ==
- Urban biosphere reserve

== V ==
- Variable retention - Vulnerability and susceptibility in conservation biology - Vulnerable species

== W ==
- Water Conservation Order - Waterbar - Waterway restoration - Weed - Wetland conservation - Wilderness area - Wildlife corridor - Wildlife Conservation Society - Wildlife reserve - Wildlife trade - Woodland management - World Cleanup Day - World Commission on Protected Areas - World Conference on Breeding Endangered Species in Captivity as an Aid to their Survival - World Heritage Site - World Network of Biosphere Reserves

== Z ==
- Zoo - Zoogeography

== Conventions, protocols, panels and summits ==
- Biosafety protocol - Montreal 2000
- Convention on Biological Diversity
- Convention on the Conservation of Migratory Species of Wild Animals
- Convention on Fishing and Conservation of Living Resources of the High Seas
- Convention on International Trade in Endangered Species of Wild Fauna and Flora (CITES)
- Convention on the Protection and Use of Transboundary Watercourses and International Lakes
- Convention on Wetlands of International Importance Especially As Waterfowl Habitat - Ramsar Convention
- Earth Summit 2002 (World Summit on Sustainable Development), Johannesburg 2002
- Intergovernmental Panel on Climate Change
- International Convention for the Regulation of Whaling
- International Seabed Authority
- International Treaty on Plant Genetic Resources for Food and Agriculture
- International Tropical Timber Agreement, 1983
- IUCN protected area categories
- IUCN Red List
- United Nations Convention on the Law of the Sea
- World Commission on Protected Areas - WCPA

== United Nations bodies ==
- UNEP World Conservation Monitoring Centre (WCMC)
- United Nations Educational, Scientific and Cultural Organization
- United Nations Environment Programme (UNEP)
- United Nations Framework Convention on Climate Change

== See also ==
- Index of environmental articles
- List of endangered species
- List of environmental issues
- List of invasive species
- Environmental agreements
- Environmentalism
