= Mitchell's Grove Nature Preserve =

Nature preserve in Illinois, US

- IUCN category V (protected landscape/seascape)
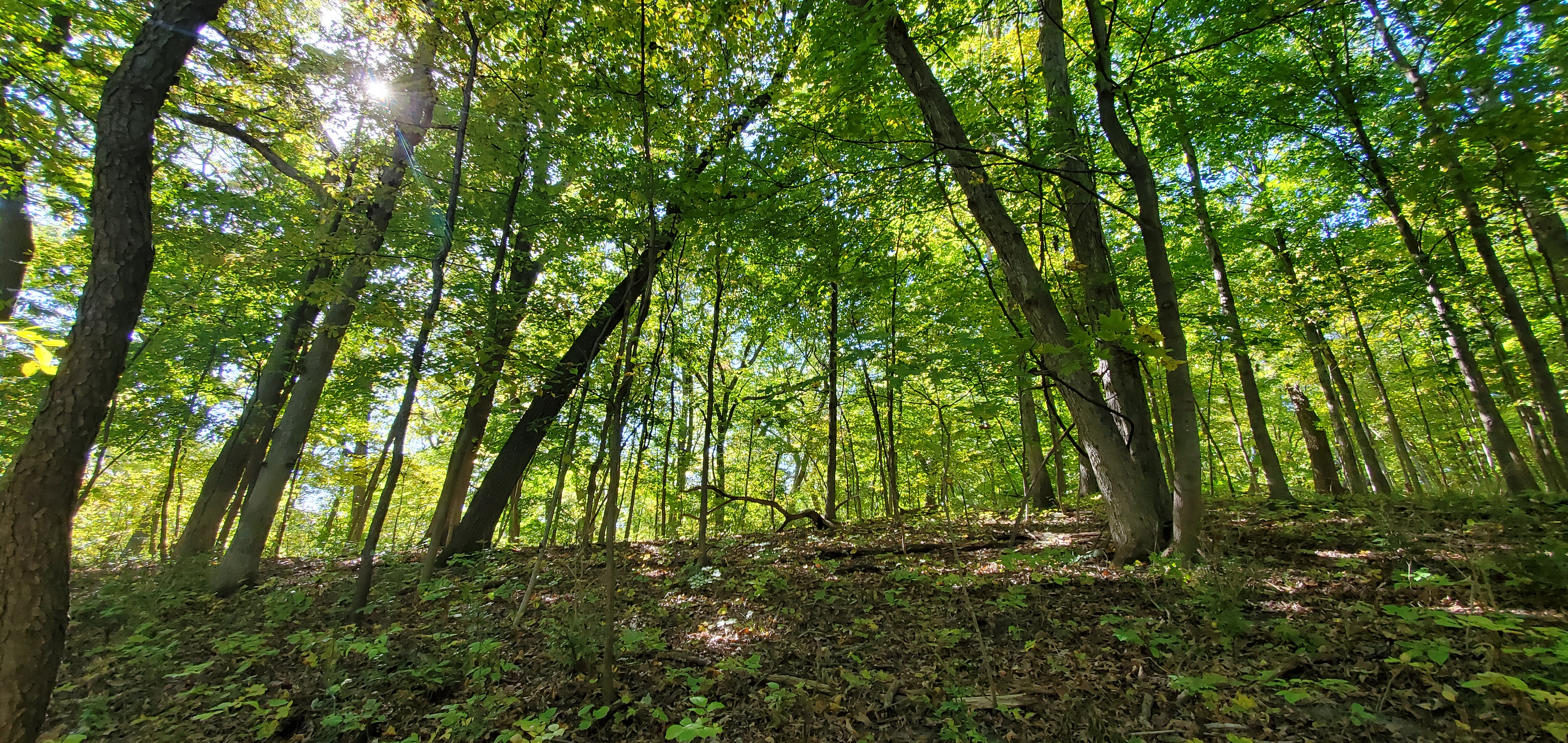
- Upland forest at Mitchell's Grove

- Location within Illinois Location within the United States
- Location: LaSalle County, Illinois, U.S.
- Nearest city: Peru, Illinois
- Coordinates: 41°22′39.10″N 89°05′21.00″W
- Area: 184 acres (74 ha)
- Established: July 1997
- Governing body: Illinois Department of Natural Resources

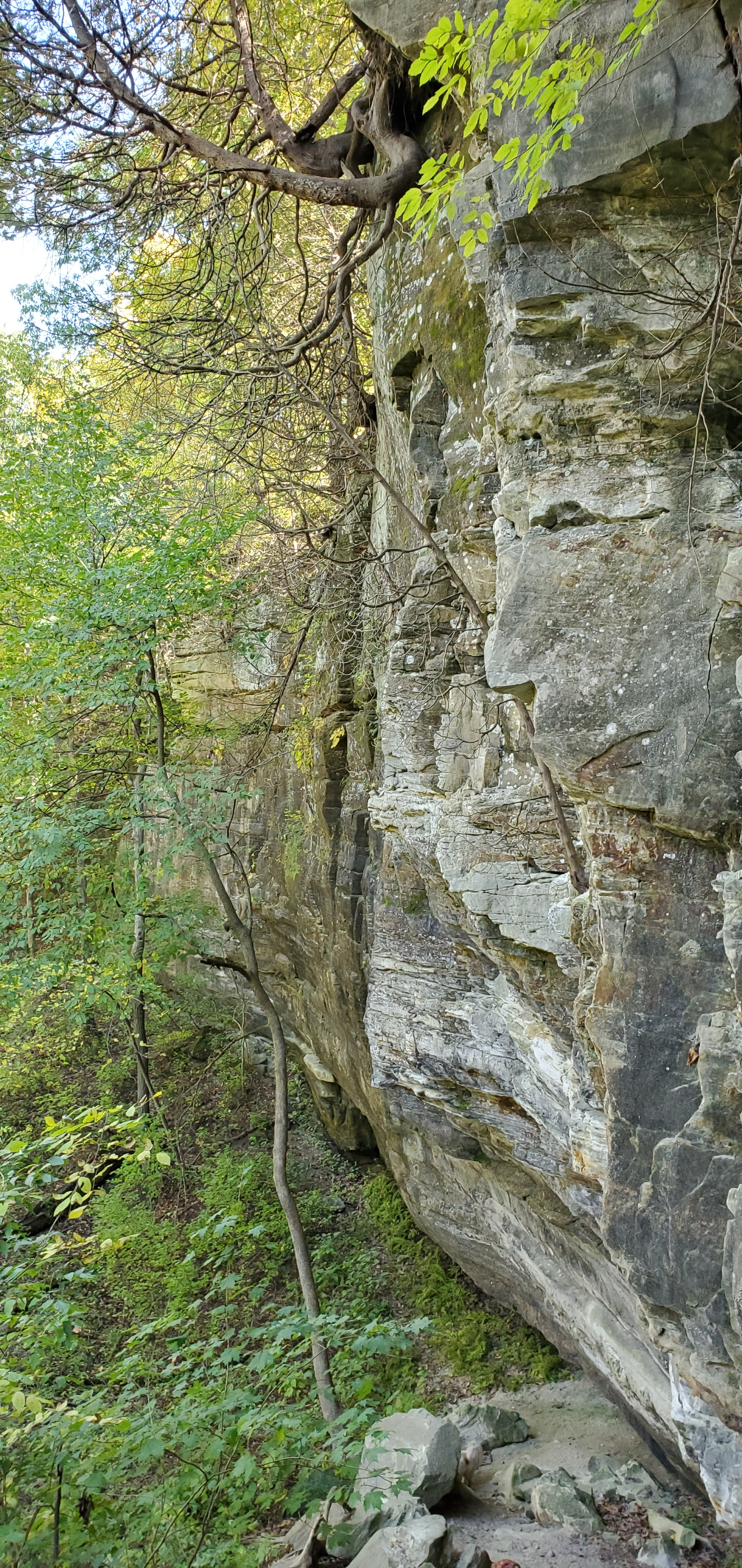
Sandstone bluffs at Mitchell's Grove

Mitchell's Grove Nature Preserve is a 184 acres (74 ha) nature preserve and State Natural Area located in LaSalle County, Illinois, situated between Tomahawk Creek and the Little Vermillion River north of their confluence. It is composed of diverse terrain with over 300 plant species present. While much of the upland area is oak savanna and prairie, the bottomlands consist of several different types of mesic forest with diverse plant communities. The site was given to the state of Illinois by William and Irene Mitchell in 1997.

== History ==
Mitchell's Grove was heavily affected by glacial action during the Wisconsin glaciation. The movement of ice over the site lead to the presence of Glacial erratics and till. The broad main valley is likely glacial in origin while the numerous small ravines are the result of erosion of the sandstone bedrock. The vertical sandstone cliffs found here are also related to the presence of the Peru Monocline Fault.

== Flora and fauna ==
A plant survey conducted from 1999 to 2000 documented 333 native plant species including several threatened species such as Burgess Forked Aster and White Cedar. The deep valleys with a prevailing northern exposure and heavy tree cover make the site a glacial refugium that supports species that would typically be found in more northern latitudes such as Swamp Saxifrage.

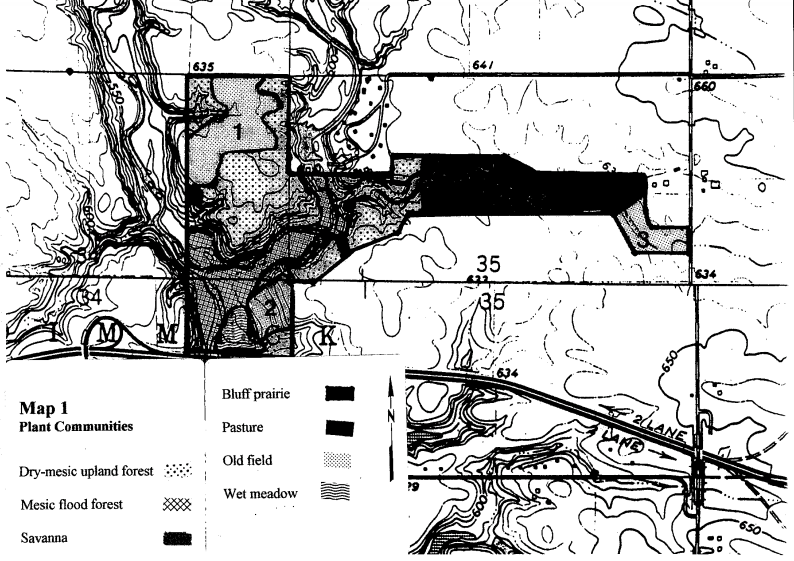
Map of Mitchell's Grove Plant Communities

The same survey listed 21 species of lichen, 39 species of moss, and 4 species of liverwort. No species of moss or liverwort were found in areas previously used for agriculture.

63 Invasive species were also identified in 2000 with varying degrees of infestation. Amur Honeysuckle, an invasive plant from western Asia, was recorded as a dominant species in the shrub layer of the bottomland forest. In the open prairie and savannah, Reed Canary Grass is listed as a growing population. Without treatment, it could substantially alter the ecosystem of the preserve.

== Water quality ==
Hydrological and aquatic biomonitoring was conducted for the Tommohawk Creek and Little Vermillion River from 1998 to 1999. The research concluded that the water quality was from good to fair depending on the season. Aquatic insect communities of mayflies and caddisflies were documented and used to calculate the Index of biological integrity for the monitoring sites. Increased turbidity was observed in the Little Vermillion River. This was caused by runoff from agricultural fields and a limestone quarry upstream from the preserve.
