= Aquatic biomonitoring =

Scientific field

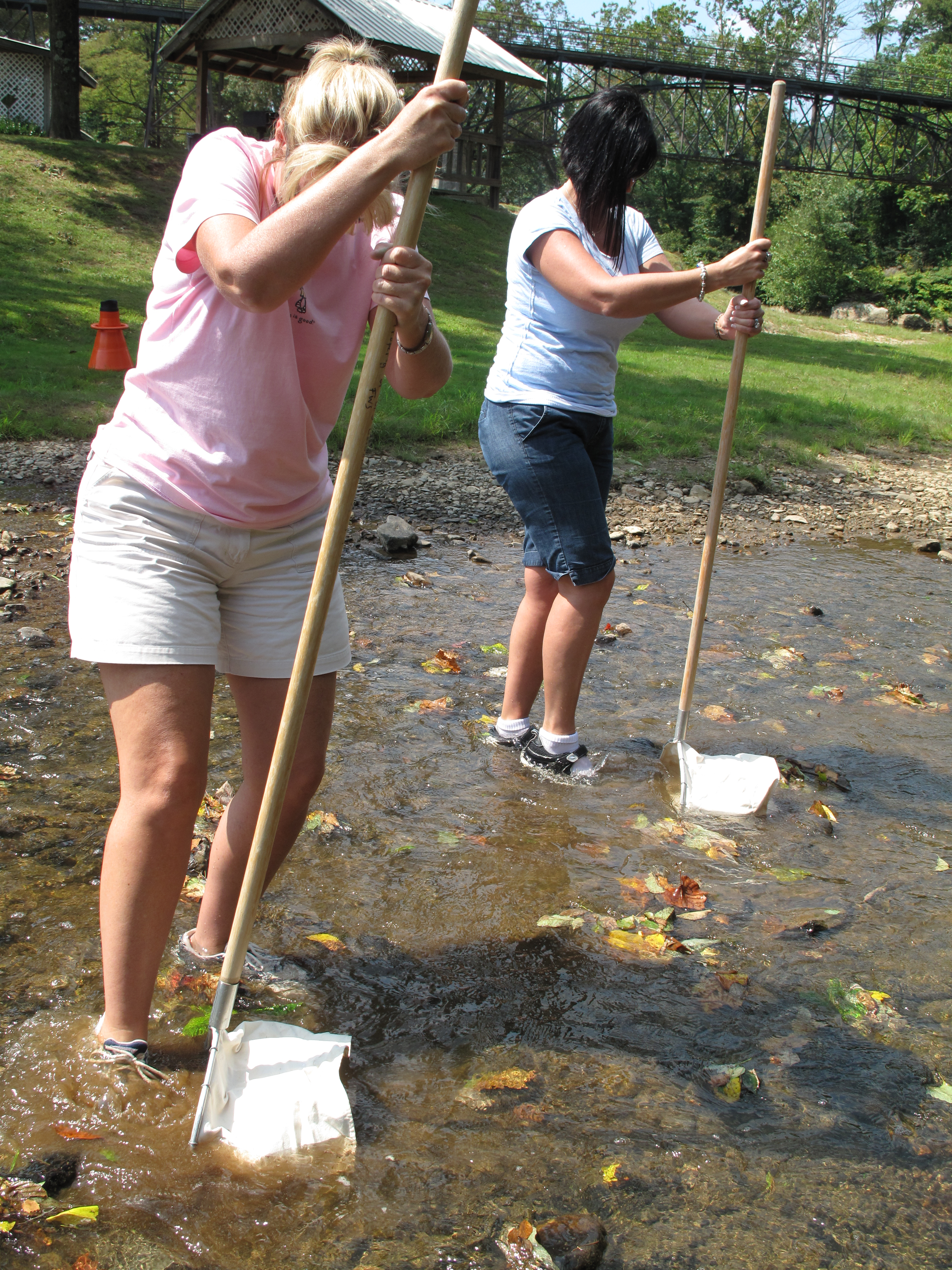
A biosurvey on the North Toe River. North Carolina

Aquatic biomonitoring is the science of inferring the ecological condition of rivers, lakes, streams, and wetlands by examining the organisms (fish, invertebrates, insects, plants, and algae) that live there. While aquatic biomonitoring is the most common form of biomonitoring, any ecosystem can be studied in this manner.

== Purpose ==
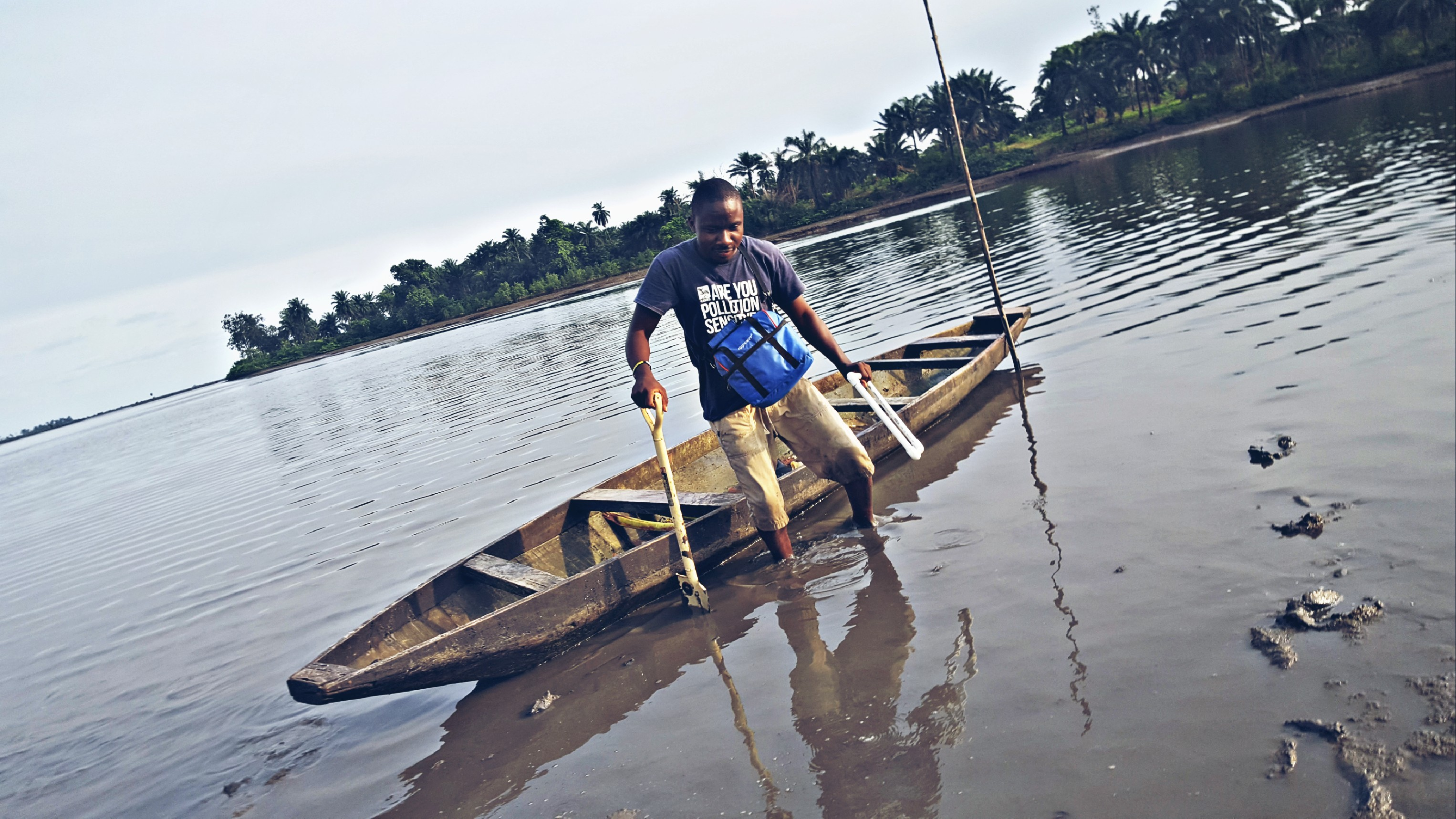
A scientist returning from a sampling expedition at an oil spill site on Bodo Creek in the Niger River Delta

Aquatic biomonitoring is an important tool for assessing aquatic life forms and their habitats. It can reveal the overall health and status of the ecosystem, detect environmental trends and the impacts of different stressors, and can be used to evaluate the effect that various human activities have on the overall health of aquatic environments. Water pollution and general stresses to aquatic life have a major impact on the environment. The main sources of pollution to oceans, rivers, and lakes are human caused events or activities, such as sewage, oil spills, surface runoff, littering, ocean mining, and nuclear waste.

Monitoring aquatic life can also be beneficial in monitoring and understanding adjacent land ecosystems. Rapid changes to an environment, like, pollution, can alter ecosystems and community assemblages, and endanger species that live in or close to water. Many aquatic species serve as food sources for terrestrial species, which are therefore impacted by the size and health of aquatic populations.

== Indicator organisms ==
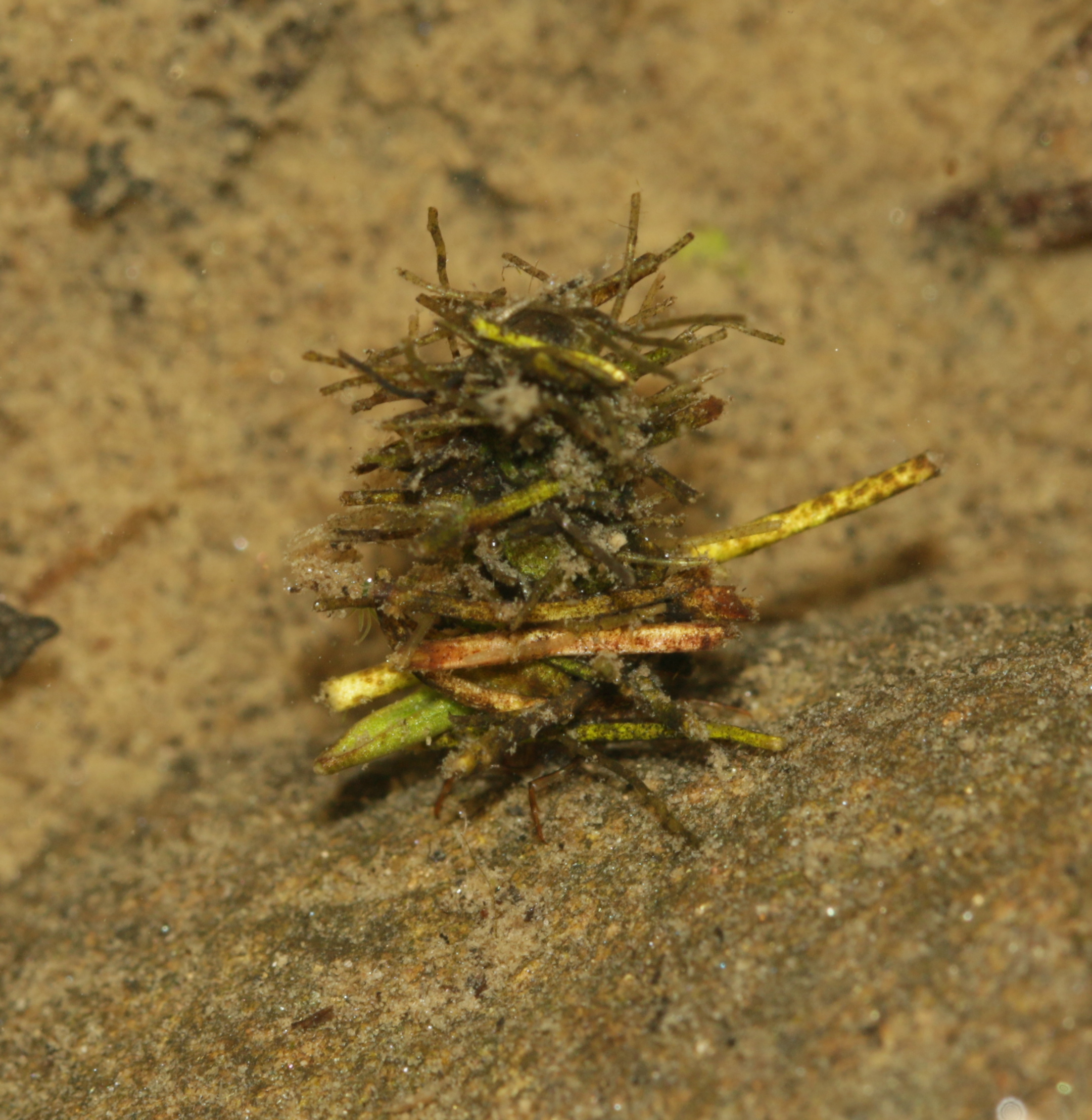
Caddis fly spp. larvae are a common indicator organism

Aquatic invertebrates, most popularly the larvae of the caddis fly sp., are responsive to climate change, low levels of pollution and temperature change. As a result, they have the longest history of use in biomonitoring programs. Additionally, macroscopic species: frogs, fish, and some plant species, as well as, many forms of microscopic life, like bacteria and protozoa are used as indicator organisms in a variety of applications, storm water run-off among them.

Many species of Macroalgae (including Cyanobacteria, though not technically a true alga) are also used in biomonitoring for both aquatic and marine environments, as their short lifespan makes them very reactive to changes.

== Common methods ==
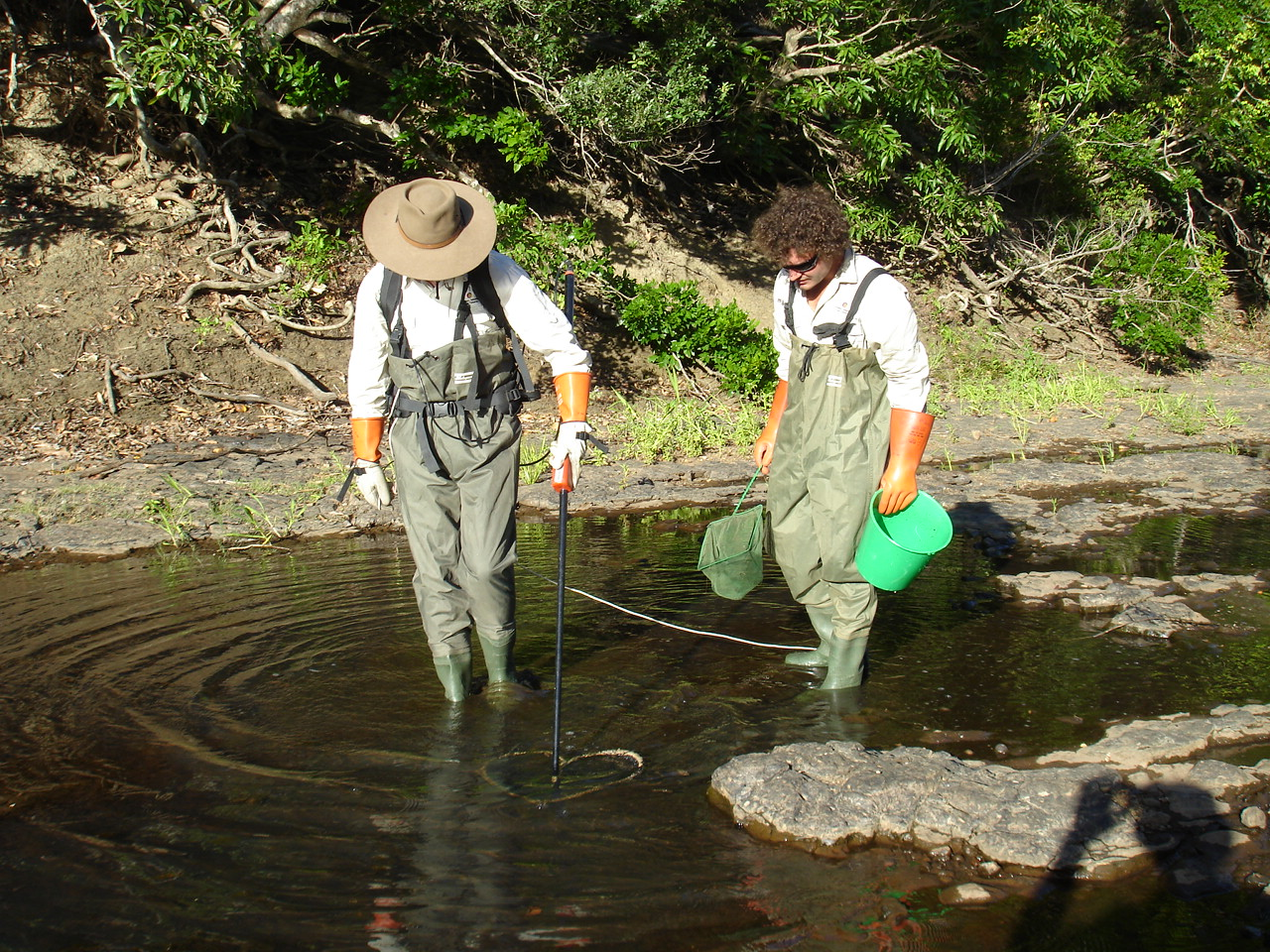
Population and species surveying using electrofishing equipment

A biomonitoring assessment requires a baseline dataset which, ideally, defines the environment in its natural or default state. This is then used for comparison against any subsequent measurements, in order to assess potential alterations or trends.

In some cases, these datasets are used to create standardised tools for assessing water quality via biomonitoring data, such as the Specific Pollution Index (SPI) and South African Diatom Index (SADI).

=== Methods employed in aquatic biomonitoring ===
- monitoring and assessing aquatic species (incl. plants, animals, and bacteria)
- monitoring the behavior of certain aquatic species and assessing any changes in species behavior
- analyzing the biochemical make-up of the waterbody, and its potential influence on the species that depend on it.

=== Common tools of ecological and biological assessments ===
- Bioassays. Test organisms are exposed to an environment and their response is measured. Typical organisms used in bioassays are certain species of plants, bacteria, fish, water fleas (Daphnia), and frogs.
- Community assessments. Also called biosurveys. An entire community of organisms is sampled to see what types of taxa remain. In aquatic ecosystems, these assessments often focus on invertebrates, algae, macrophytes (aquatic plants), fish, or amphibians. Rarely, other large vertebrates (reptiles, birds, and mammals) may be considered.
- Online biomonitoring devices. One example uses chemoreceptor cells of molluscs and similar animals to monitor their coastal and fresh water habitats. Different types of animals are used for this purpose either in the lab or in the field. The study of the opening and closing activity of clams' valves is an example of one possible way to monitor in-situ the quality of fresh and coastal waters.

== Variables considered ==
=== Water quality ===
Water quality is graded both on appearance, for example: clear, cloudy, full of algae, and chemistry. Determining the specific levels of enzymes, bacteria, metals, and minerals found in water is extremely important. Some contaminants, such as metals and certain organic wastes, can be lethal to individual creatures and could thereby ultimately lead to extinction of certain species. This could affect both aquatic and land ecosystems and cause disruption in other biomes and ecosystems.

=== Water temperature ===
Water body temperature is one of the most ubiquitous variables collected in aquatic biomonitoring. Temperatures at the water surface, through the water column, and in the lowest levels of the water body (benthic zone) can all provide insight into different aspects of an aquatic ecosystem. Water temperature is directly affected by climate change and can have negative affects on many aquatic species, such as salmon. Salmon spawning is temperature dependent: there is a heat accumulation threshold which must be reached before hatching can occur. Post-hatching, salmon live in water within a critical range in temperature, with exposure to temperatures outside of this being potentially lethal. This sensitivity makes them useful indicators of changes in water temperature, hence their use in climate change studies. Similarly, Daphnia populations have been evidenced as being negatively affected by climate change, as earlier springs have caused hatching periods to de-couple from the peak window of food availability.

=== Community make-up ===
Species community assemblages and changes therein can help researchers to infer changes in the health of an ecosystem. In typical unpolluted temperate streams of Europe and North America, certain insect taxa predominate. Mayflies (Ephemeroptera), caddisflies (Trichoptera), and stoneflies (Plecoptera) are the most common insects in these undisturbed streams. In contrast, in rivers disturbed by urbanization, agriculture, forestry, and other perturbations, flies (Diptera), and especially midges (family Chironomidae) predominate.

=== Local geology ===
Surface water can be affected by local geology, as minerals leached from sub-surface rocks can enter surface water bodies and influence water chemistry. Examples of this are the Werii River (Tigray, Ethiopia), where elevated concentrations of heavy metals have been linked to the underlying slate, and drinking wells in Indigenous communities near Anchorage, Alaska, where high concentrations of arsenic have been linked to the underlying McHugh Complex rock formation.

== Limitations ==
- Reliance on accurate species identification - When using visual identification in the field, there is the potential for species to be misidentified, which could lead to incorrect analysis and conclusions. To reduce the likelihood of such errors, many monitoring organisations utilise laboratory verification of sample specimens for quality control purposes.
- Species specific - It can be difficult to draw comparisons between results unless the same indicator organism has been used in each study, as every species has an individual niche and associated ideal conditions. Even similar species (as defined by either taxonomy or niche) may have different reactions and different thresholds for change.
- External influences - Changes in population size or health caused by external factors may be incorrectly interpreted as resulting from changes in the environment. For example, a reduction in population that occurs due to disease, but coincides with a change in environmental conditions, could be misconstrued as resulting from the latter change.
- Misleading results - Survival of species usually regarded as 'sensitive' can lead to the conclusion that there has been little change or contamination of an environment, which may be incorrect. An example of this is amphibians, which have traditionally been considered a highly sensitive class in regards to environmental changes, however, some research indicates that this may only be true for phenols, with amphibians having similar sensitivity to other contaminants (e.g. heavy metals) as other aquatic taxonomic groups, such as bivalves.

== See also ==
- Bioindicator
- Biological integrity
- Biological monitoring working party (a measurement procedure)
- Indicator species
