= Ecological damage =

Ecological damage may refer to:

- environmental degradation
- something adversely affecting ecological health
- something adversely affecting ecosystem health
