= Index of biological integrity =

An index of biological integrity (IBI), also called an index of biotic integrity, is a scientific tool typically used to identify and classify water pollution problems, although there have been some efforts to apply the idea to terrestrial environments. An IBI associates anthropogenic influences on a water body with biological activity in the water body, and is formulated using data developed from biosurveys. Biological integrity is associated with how "pristine" an environment is and its function relative to the potential or original state of an ecosystem before human alterations were imposed. Biological integrity is built on the assumption that a decline in the values of an ecosystem's functions are primarily caused by human activity or alterations. The more an environment and its original processes are altered, then by definition, the less biological integrity it holds for the community as a whole. If these processes were to change over time naturally, without human influence, the integrity of the ecosystem would remain intact. Similar to the concept of ecosystem health, the integrity of the ecosystem relies heavily on the processes that occur within it because those determine which organisms can inhabit an area and the complexities of their interactions. Deciding which of the many possible states or conditions of an ecosystem is appropriate or desirable is a political or policy decision.

== Overview ==
To quantitatively assess changes in the composition of biologic communities, IBIs are developed to accurately reflect the ecological complexity from statistical analysis. There is no one universal IBI, and developing metrics that consistently give accurate assessment of the monitored population requires rigorous testing to confirm its validity for a given subject. Often IBIs are region-specific and require experienced professionals to provide sufficient quality data to correctly assess a score. Because communities naturally vary as do samples collected from a larger population, identifying robust statistics with acceptable variance is an area of active and important research.

This can be a powerful tool to identify systemic impacts on the health of biological systems. IBIs are increasingly involved in the identification of impairment, and confirmation of recovery of impaired waters, in the total maximum daily load process required by the Clean Water Act in the USA.

Unlike chemical testing of water samples, which gives brief snap-shots of chemical concentrations, an IBI captures an integrated net impact on a biological community structure. While the complete absence, particularly sudden disappearance of, suites of indicator species can constitute powerful evidence of a specific pollutant or stress factor, IBIs generally do not resolve a specific cause of impairment.

The IBI concept was formulated by James Karr in 1981. To date IBIs have been developed for fish, algae, macroinvertebrates, pupal exuvia (shed skins of chironomidae), vascular plants, and combinations of these. Comparatively little work has been done to develop IBIs for terrestrial ecosystems.

== Biosurvey protocols ==
Biosurvey protocols have been published for use in different waterbody types and ecoregions. One such publication is the Rapid Bioassessment Protocols manual for streams and rivers, issued by the U.S. Environmental Protection Agency (EPA). Such protocols provide a structure for developing an IBI, which may include measures such as richness of taxa (species, genera, etc.) and proportion of pollution-tolerant or intolerant taxa.

== Development with volunteer and professional staff ==
It is possible to create IBIs for use by minimally trained monitoring personnel, however the precision obtainable is lower than that conducted by trained professionals. Safeguards to assure robustness in spite of potential misidentifications or protocol variations require careful testing. Ongoing quality control by established experts is needed to maintain data integrity, and the analysis of IBI results becomes more complex. Use of trained volunteers is being pioneered by government agencies responsible for monitoring large numbers of water bodies with limited resources, such as the Minnesota Pollution Control Agency (MPCA) and local volunteer stream monitoring programs supported by MPCA. EPA has published guidance to assist volunteer programs in formulating IBIs and related findings. While IBIs from such programs are legally admissible in US courts, defending the validity of conclusions based solely on such results is unlikely to be feasible.

Agreement among multiple IBIs from data collected by established professionals can be more conclusive. A case in point is the phenomenon that stream IBI scores indicate significant impairment, or partial ecological collapse where more than 10 to 15 percent of the immediately surrounding watershed is impervious due to urbanization. Identifying reasons for such impairments, and possible exceptions to these trends, are major research challenges for academics studying cumulative watershed effects, and the use of low-impact development techniques to mitigate the impacts of stormwater runoff pollution.

== See also ==
- Bioindicator
- Biological integrity
- Biological monitoring working party (a measurement procedure)
- Biotic index
- Ecosystem health
- Normative science
- Water quality
