= James Karr =

American ecologist, biologist, and author

James R. Karr
- Occupations: Ecologist, ornithologist, conservation biologist, stream ecologist, fishery biologist, academic and author

Academic background
- Education: BS., Fish and Wildlife Biology; MS., Zoology; PhD., Zoology
- Alma mater: Iowa State University; University of Illinois, Urbana-Champaign

James R. Karr is an American ecologist, ornithologist, conservation biologist, stream ecologist, academic, and author. He is a Professor Emeritus of Aquatic and Fishery Sciences at the University of Washington, Seattle.

Karr's research focuses on fisheries, ornithology, ecology, conservation biology, and water quality. He has authored and co-authored more than 250 research articles and 2 books including Entering the Watershed: A New Approach to Save America's River Ecosystems and Restoring Life in Running Waters: Better Biological Monitoring. He is the recipient of the Olympic Peninsula Audubon Society Conservation Award in 2017, the 2005 Environmental Stewardship Award from the Society for Freshwater Science, and the 2004 Carl R. Sullivan Fishery Conservation Award from the American Fisheries Society.

Karr is an elected Fellow of the American Ornithological Society, the American Association for the Advancement of Science and the Society for Freshwater Science.

== Education and early career ==
Karr earned a bachelor's degree in Fish and Wildlife Biology from Iowa State University in 1965. He went on to obtain a master's degree in Zoology from the University of Illinois, Urbana-Champaign. Subsequently, he received a Ph.D. in Zoology from the University of Illinois, Urbana-Champaign in 1970, after which he worked as a Postdoctoral Research Associate at Princeton University and at the Smithsonian Tropical Research Institute in Panama (1970–1972).

== Career ==
Karr began his academic career as an Assistant Professor of Biology at Purdue University from 1972 to 1975. In 1975, he joined the University of Illinois as an Associate Professor of Ecology and was later appointed Professor of Ecology. He served as Deputy Director from 1984 to 1987, and Acting Director from 1987 to 1988 at the Smithsonian Tropical Research Institute in Panama. Subsequently, he began serving as Harold H. Bailey Professor of Biology at the Virginia Polytechnic Institute and State University in 1988 and later became a Professor of Ornithology at the University of Virginia Mountain Lake Biological Station in the following year. In 1991, he assumed the position of Professor of Zoology, later appointed Professor of Fisheries in 1995 at the University of Washington. From 1991 to 1995, he held the position of Director of the Institute for Environmental Studies. Since 2006, he has been Professor Emeritus of Aquatic and Fishery Sciences at the University of Washington, Seattle. In 2017, the University of Illinois announced an annual lecture series called the "Annual James R. Karr Lecture in Aquatic Biology and Conservation."

Karr became an Elective Member of the Pan-American Section Governing Body of the International Council for Bird Preservation in 1980, He also traveled as a Smithsonian Expert Study Leader to Costa Rica, Panama, and Peru, and Lecturer on international expeditions until 2019 with the University of Washington Alumni Travel Office.

== Research ==
Karr has contributed to the fields of ecology and conservation biology by studying stream ecology, watershed management, tropical forest ecology, ornithology, landscape ecology, and environmental policy. He is known for creating the "Index of Biotic Integrity," a multimetric index (MMI) that documents the extent to which human activity has altered living systems from their natural condition in the absence of human activity. MMIs have been developed for a broad diversity of taxonomic groups including fish, insects, plants, microbes in diverse habitat types, USEPA Scientist Wayne Davis stated, "Few events can transform the nature of a discipline as has the development and application of the original index of biotic integrity (IBI)".

== Works ==
Karr has co-authored 2 books focusing on water management and conservation. In the 1993 book Entering the Watershed: A New Approach to Save America's River Ecosystems, he provided an assessment of the state of damage to rivers and species, examined issues in earlier policies, and presented a framework with specific policy recommendations. The Environmental Education Director at the Florida Department of Environmental Protection in 1995, James K. Lewis remarked, "Perhaps one of the most important contributions made by Entering the Watershed is its detailed analysis and indictment of the failures of the current methods of river restoration."

In the book Restoring Life in Running Waters: Better Biological Monitoring, Karr and Ellen W. Chu discussed freshwater ecosystems in the United States and emphasized the necessity of employing biological perspectives to comprehend their current state. In a review published in BioScience, academic Judith Dudley wrote, "Their book makes a case for more widespread use of integrated indexes and answers critics' concerns about the use of such indexes."

=== Fish resources and communities ===
Karr has explored fish communities and ichthyology. In a highly cited paper published in Fisheries, he found that conventional chemical water quality measures were not a sufficient surrogate for biotic assessment of freshwater fish resources and introduced a more refined assessment system using fish community attributes. He proposed the Index of Biotic Integrity (IBI) to use the biological monitoring of fish to examine environmental degradation, and also found that the IBI is an accurate measure of watershed and stream condition when adjusted for stream size and zoogeography, with comparisons of maximum species richness lines suggesting two distinct groups of fish communities shaped by ecological rather than historical factors.

Introduced by Karr, IBI is a multimetric index (MMI). First developed for the study of fish and subsequently adapted for use with benthic invertebrates, algae, birds, and shrub-steppe insects, and many other taxa in diverse habitats and geographic areas. Two economists connected the use of IBI to improvements in economic analysis.

Karr and Gorman determined that stream habitat complexity is correlated with fish species diversity and that natural streams support more diverse and stable fish communities than modified streams. In addition, his research revealed that woody debris is important for fish habitat in small streams, especially during low-flow years.

Karr and colleagues also researched salmon and established that juvenile Chinook salmon in Puget Sound utilize the neritic environment differently based on their origin, with wild salmon exhibiting broader seasonal density distributions and smaller sizes compared to hatchery-reared salmon, indicating varying utilization and interaction patterns within the ecosystem.

=== Water resources management ===
Karr has investigated water resources management to understand how it can be managed effectively. He highlighted the negative consequences of human efforts to tame rivers, such as the loss of native species and degradation of ecosystems, and emphasized the need for policy changes to enable better river management and restoration. His work brought to light that traditional erosion control programs alone are not sufficient to ensure high-quality water resources, and biological monitoring using the Index of Biotic Integrity (IBI) is a useful approach when assessing water resource quality. With colleagues, he developed an IBI for stream benthic invertebrates (B-IBI) using 13 discriminating attributes that effectively assessed the biological condition of streams in the Tennessee Valley, demonstrating its potential as an assessment tool for evaluating water resources impacted by human society. Drawing on research across several geographic regions (eastern and western U.S. and Japan), he defined an integrative benthic index of biological integrity (B-IBI) for the assessment of biological systems in running waters.

=== Forest ecology ===
Karr and colleagues' work on forest ecology focused on the management and conservation of forested lands. In a joint study, they highlighted that while certain postfire practices aid forest ecosystem recovery, including the retention of large trees and fireline rehabilitation, others, such as seeding exotic species and salvage logging in burned areas, hinder ecological restoration efforts, emphasizing the need for a comprehensive understanding of their impacts on western U.S. forested lands and rivers. They demonstrated the effectiveness of the Northwest Forest Plan (NWFP) in conserving biodiversity and suggested enhancements to address climate change and land-use threats. In other team efforts, interdisciplinary teams reviewed the ecological effects of domestic, wild, and feral ungulates on western public lands during a period of rapid climate change and outlined new directions in conservation for the national wildlife refuge system.

=== Ornithology ===
Karr documented the higher species diversity of tropical vs. temperate forest bird communities and did comparative studies of bird community ecology in temperate vs. tropical forests. He revealed variations in species richness and guild structure of avifaunas across different tropical regions, emphasizing the influence of geographic proximity and climate on guild composition, with Central American forests having the richest avifaunas and Neotropical samples containing the largest number of guilds. Additionally, he found that avian community structure in tropical regions like central Panama varies seasonally, affected by vegetation complexity, food resources, and microhabitat selection.

In 1977, Karr established a long-term monitoring program; birds are sampled twice each year with mist nets at a site in central Panama, the Limbo plot, in Parque Nacional Soberania. The leadership of the project shifted to Jeffrey Brawn and later to Corey Tarwater over the 47 years since the netting protocol was initiated. After 44 years, the project team documented widespread and severe declines in estimated bird abundance (≥50%) for 35 of 40 declining species. Only two species increased in estimated abundance and 15 were statistically stable. The evidence that tropical bird populations may be experiencing systematic declines, even in relatively intact forests suggested that many species may not be able to sustain their populations in this ≈22,000-ha national park.

In collaborative research, John G. Blake and Karr concluded that woodlot size significantly influenced bird community structure in Illinois, with smaller woodlots hosting generalist species and larger woodlots supporting more specialized ones, emphasizing the importance of maintaining larger forested habitats to protect local and regional bird diversity.

=== Science and public policy ===
Karr outlined how frenzied and uninhibited economic growth work resulted in the transformation of highly productive, self-maintaining ecosystems into barren landscapes. He also noted that despite the post-World War II boom in science and technology, headlines suggested a diminishing role of science in government policy-making, particularly in the environmental context. In addition, he believed that although the government supported the educational and research system, it frequently constrained scientists' ability to voice their concerns. He asserted that scientists should vocalize their perspectives when the government neglects scientific input, akin to how engineers would speak out against flawed bridge designs because scientists have a responsibility to speak up when human actions jeopardize the vital life-support systems on which society relies.

Karr and Chu addressed the historical evolution of human impact on Earth's environments, emphasizing the degradation caused by contemporary practices, and advocated for an integrative approach to measure, understand, and manage these impacts, stressing the urgent need for uniting ecological and economic sciences to halt the impoverishment of living systems—human and nonhuman, society's greatest challenge for the 21st century.

== Awards and honors ==
- 2004 – Carl R. Sullivan Fishery Conservation Award, American Fisheries Society
- 2005 – Environmental Stewardship Award, Society for Freshwater Science
- 2017 – Conservation Award, Olympic Peninsula Audubon Society

== Bibliography ==
=== Books ===
- Entering the Watershed: A New Approach to Save America's River Ecosystems (1993) ISBN 9781559632751
- Restoring Life in Running Waters: Better Biological Monitoring (2013) ISBN 9781559636742

=== Selected articles ===
- Karr, J. R. (1981). Assessment of biotic integrity using fish communities. Fisheries, 6(6), 21-27.
- Karr, J. R., & Dudley, D. R. (1981). Ecological perspective on water quality goals. Environmental management, 5, 55-68.
- Karr, J. R. (1986). Assessing biological integrity in running waters: a method and its rationale. Illinois Natural History Survey Special Publication no. 05.
- Karr, J. R. (1991). Biological integrity: a long‐neglected aspect of water resource management. Ecological applications, 1(1), 66-84.
- Poff, N. L., Allan, J. D., Bain, M. B., Karr, J. R., Prestegaard, K. L., Richter, B. D., ... & Stromberg, J. C. (1997). The natural flow regime. BioScience, 47(11), 769-784.
- Karr, J. R., Larson, E. R., & Chu, E. W. (2022). Ecological integrity is both real and valuable. Conservation Science and Practice, 4(2), e583.
