= Molanna ulmerina =

Scientific classification
- Domain: Eukaryota
- Kingdom: Animalia
- Phylum: Arthropoda
- Class: Insecta
- Order: Trichoptera
- Family: Molannidae
- Genus: Molanna
- Species: M. ulmerina

Binomial name
- Molanna ulmerina Navás, 1934

Synonyms
- Molanna musetta Betten, 1934

Species of caddisfly

Molanna ulmerina is a species of hood casemaker in the family Molannidae. It is found in North America.
