= Biological monitoring working party =

The biological monitoring working party (BMWP) is a procedure for measuring water quality using families of macroinvertebrates as biological indicators.

The method is based on the principle that different aquatic invertebrates have different tolerances to pollutants. In the case of BMWP, this is based on the sensitivity/tolerance to organic pollution (i.e. nutrient enrichment that can affect the availability of dissolved oxygen). It is important to recognise that the ranking of sensitivity/tolerance will vary for different kinds of pollution. In the case of BMWP/Organic pollution rankings, the presence of mayflies or stoneflies for instance indicate the cleanest waterways and are given a tolerance score of 10. The lowest scoring invertebrates are worms (Oligochaeta) which score 1. The number of different macroinvertebrates is also an important factor, because a better quality water is assumed to contain fewer pollutants that would exclude "sensitive" species - resulting in a higher diversity.

Kick sampling, where a net is placed downstream from the sampler and the river bed is agitated with the foot for a given period of time (the standard is 3 minutes), is employed. Any macroinvertebrates caught in the net are stored and preserved with an alcohol solution, and identified to the family level, this can be done with the live organisms as well.

The BMWP score equals the sum of the tolerance scores of all macroinvertebrate families in the sample. A higher BMWP score is considered to reflect better water quality. Alternatively, also the Average Score Per Taxon (ASPT) score is calculated. The ASPT equals the average of the tolerance scores of all macroinvertebrate families found, and ranges from 0 to 10. The main difference between both indices is that ASPT does not depend on the family richness. Once BMWP and ASPT are calculated, the Lincoln Quality Index (LQI) is used to assess the water quality in the Anglian Water Authority area.

Other indices that can be used to assess water quality are the Chandler Score, the Trent Biotic Index and the Rapid Bioassessment Protocols.

== Scoring table ==
BMWP Score table
Group	Families	Score
Mayflies, Stoneflies, Caddisflies, True Bugs (Hemiptera), or Sedgeflies	Siphlonuridae, Heptageniidae, Leptophlebiidae, Ephemerellidae, Potamanthidae, Ephemeridae, Taeniopterygidae, Leuctridae, Capniidae, Perlodidae, Perlidae, Chloroperlidae, Aphelocheridae, Phryganeidae, Molannidae, Beraeidae, Odontoceridae, Leptoceridae, Goeridae, Lepidostomatidae, Brachycentridae, Sericostomatidae	10
Crayfish, Dragonflies, Damselflies	Astacidae, Lestidae, Agriidae, Gomphidae, Cordulegasteridae, Aeshnidae, Corduliidae, Libellulidae	8
Mayflies, Stoneflies, Caddisflies or Sedge flies	Caenidae, Nemouridae, Rhyacophilidae, Polycentropodidae, Limnephilidae	7
Snails, Caddisflies or Sedge flies, Mussels, Gammarids, Dragonflies	Neritidae, Viviparidae, Ancylidae, Hydroptilidae, Unionidae, Corophiidae, Gammaridae, Platycnemididae, Coenagrionidae	6
Bugs, Beetles, Caddisflies or Sedgeflies, Craneflies/Black flies, Flatworms	Mesoveliidae, Hydrometridae, Gerridae, Nepidae, Naucoridae, Notonectidae, Pleidae, Corixidae, Haliplidae, Hygrobiidae, Dytiscidae, Gyrinidae, Hydrophilidae, Clambidae, Helodidae, Dryopidae, Elmidae, Chrysomelidae, Curculionidae, Hydropsychidae, Tipulidae, Simuliidae, Planariidae, Dendrocoelida	5
Mayflies, Alderflies, Leeches Water mites	Baetidae, Sialidae, Piscicolidae	4
Snails, Cockles, Leeches, Hog louse	Valvatidae, Hydrobiidae, Lymnaeidae, Physidae, Planorbidae, Sphaeriidae, Glossiphoniidae, Hirudidae, Erpobdellidae, Asellidae	3
Midges	Chironomidae	2
Worms	Oligochaeta (whole class)	1

== See also ==
- Biological integrity
- Biosurvey
- Biomonitoring
