= Biological integrity =

Metric for the quality of an ecosystem

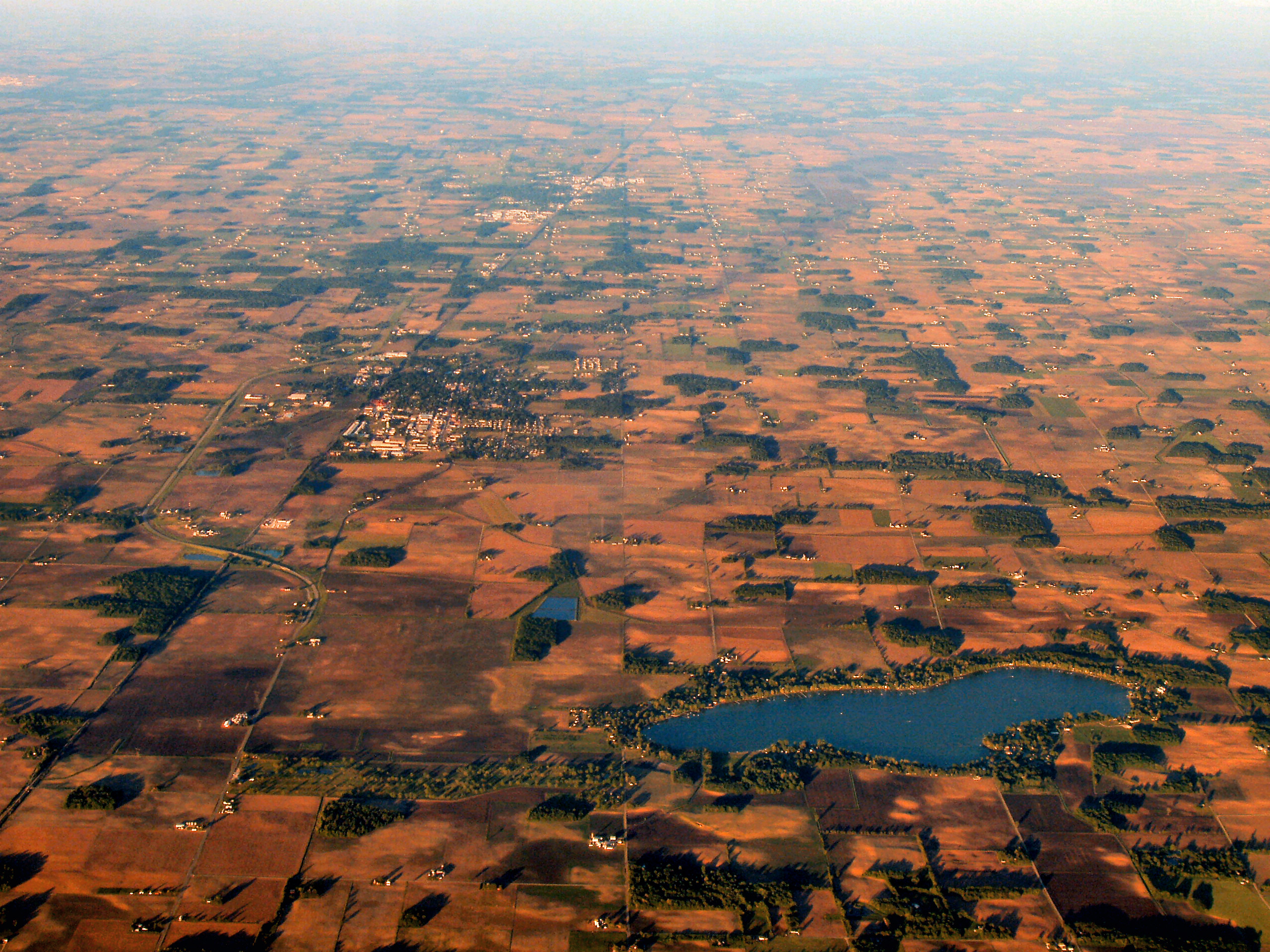
Bremen Lake, Indiana

Biological integrity is associated with how "pristine" an environment is and its function relative to the potential or original state of an ecosystem before human alterations were imposed. Biological integrity is built on the assumption that a decline in the values of an ecosystem's functions are primarily caused by human activity or alterations. The more an environment and its original processes are altered, the less biological integrity it holds for the community as a whole. If these processes were to change over time naturally, without human influence, the integrity of the ecosystem would remain intact. The integrity of the ecosystem relies heavily on the processes that occur within it because those determine what organisms can inhabit an area and the complexities of their interactions. Most of the applications of the notion of biological integrity have addressed aquatic environments, but there have been efforts to apply the concept to terrestrial environments. Determining the pristine condition of the ecosystem is in theory scientifically derived, but deciding which of the many possible states or conditions of an ecosystem is the appropriate or desirable goal is a political or policy decision and is typically the focus of policy and political disagreements. Ecosystem health is a related concept but differs from biological integrity in that the "desired condition" of the ecosystem or environment is explicitly based on the values or priorities of society.

== History ==
The concept of biological integrity first appeared in the 1972 amendments to the U.S. Federal Water Pollution Control Act, also known as the Clean Water Act. The United States Environmental Protection Agency (EPA) had used the term as a way to gauge the standards to which water should be maintained, but the vocabulary instigated years of debate about the implications of not only the meaning of biological integrity, but also how it can be measured. EPA sponsored the first conference about the term in March 1975. The conference, called "The Integrity of Water", provided the first accepted definition of biological integrity. In 1981, EPA assembled a field of experts from the U.S. Fish and Wildlife Service, academia, and its own staff to further refine the definition and identify key indicators to quantitatively measure biological integrity. The conference not only identified a definition, but also methods to evaluate the community, and they established that multiple sites should be used to determine the condition of the environment.

== Definition ==
Today, the accepted definition is "the capability of supporting and maintaining a balanced, integrated, adaptive community of organisms having a species composition, diversity, and functional organization comparable to that of the natural habitat of the region." This definition was adapted from David Frey's paper delivered at the 1975 "Integrity of Water" conference. The implications of this definition are that living systems have a variety of scales relative to which they exist, that one can quantify the parts that sustain or contribute to a system's functioning and that all systems must be seen in the context of their environments and evolutionary history. This term primarily refers to aquatic environments because the vocabulary is derived from the Clean Water Act, but the concepts can be applied to other ecosystems.

== Evaluation methods ==
In order to quantify and evaluate the biological integrity of a system, the index of biological integrity (IBI) was formulated by James Karr in 1981. In this index the baseline biological integrity (its function before human influence) and the current functions of an ecosystem are measured against one another to evaluate how much of ecosystem's function has been preserved. The IBI evaluates the ecosystem by utilizing biosurveys and comparing species richness, indicator taxa, hybrids, and invasive species. IBIs are used primarily to evaluate aquatic ecosystems although the concept is applicable to measuring biological integrity in any natural ecosystem.

== See also ==
- Bioindicator
- Biological monitoring working party (a measurement procedure)
- Biosafety
- Biotic index
- Ecological fragmentation
- Ecological health
- Ecological network
- Ecosystem health
- Environmentalism
- Green corridor
- Indicator species
- Normative science
- Remnant natural area
- Water quality
- Artificialization
