= Bryant Holsenbeck =

Mixed media environmental artist

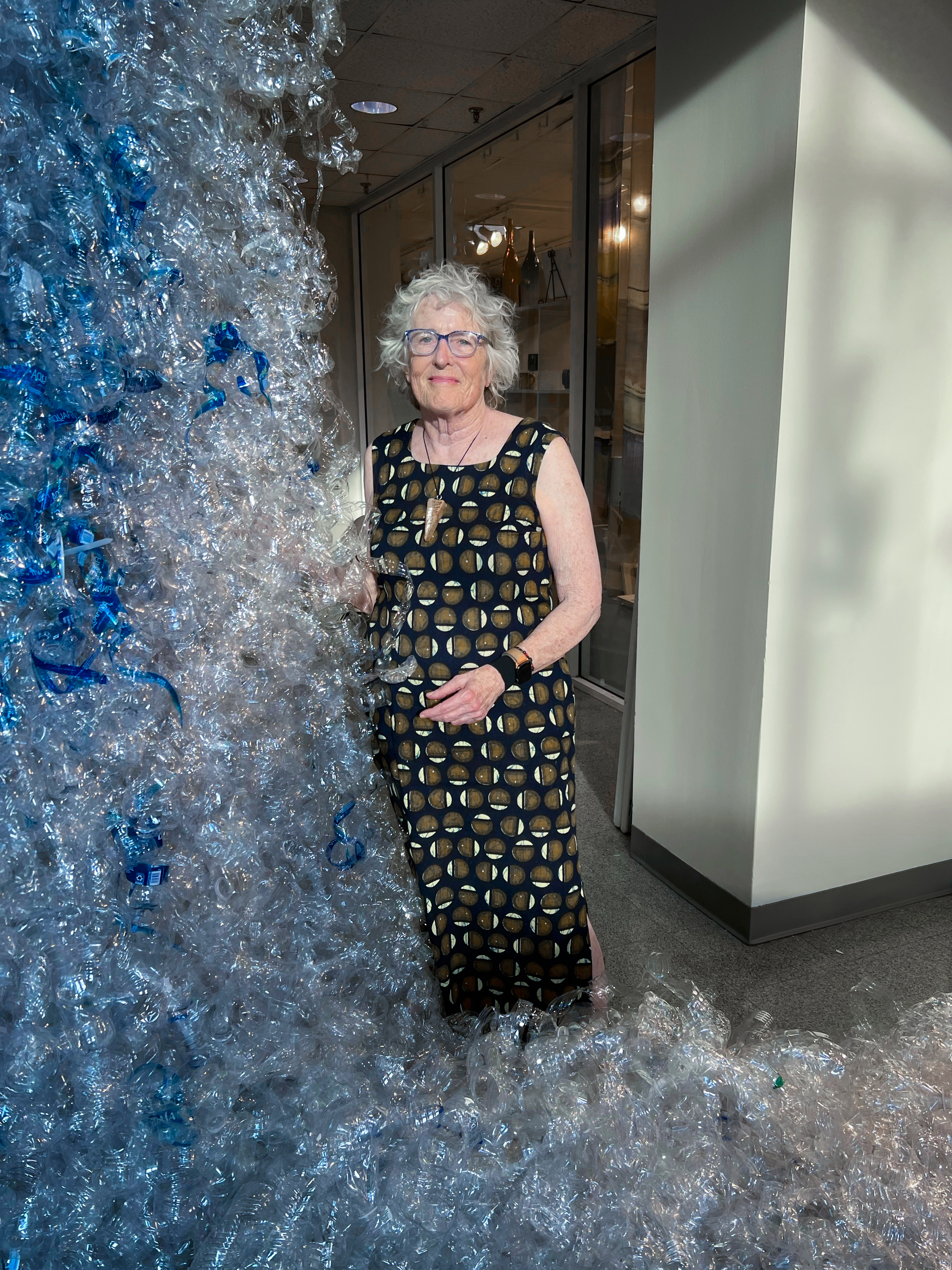
- Bryant Holsenbeck posing next to her installation for the H20 exhibition at the Greenhill Center for the Arts. Photographer Barbara Tyroler.
- Known for: Mixed media environmental art

Bryant Holsenbeck is a mixed media environmental artist, activist, educator, and author based in Durham, North Carolina.

== Early life and education ==
Holsenbeck's father was a textile engineer. Holsenbeck earned her bachelor's degree in sociology and her Master of Education from the University of North Carolina at Chapel Hill.

== Career ==
Holsenbeck uses a variety of both natural and human-made materials to create art out of repurposed items that might otherwise be discarded. Her artwork includes wrapping and weaving techniques, wire sculpting, small animal sculptures, and large-scale installations. Examples of her work include small bird sculptures made with discarded materials and large waterfall installations made of plastic bottles.

Holsenbeck's environmental art conveys importance of wildlife, draws attention to ecological devastation and the abundance of plastic waste in the United States, and promotes environmental stewardship.

Holsenbeck has exhibited her artwork and taught workshops for both adults and children in the United States, Australia, and France. She has received a variety of grants and residencies to pursue her environmental arts career.

In 2010, Holsenbeck took on the challenge of living a full year without single-use plastic. She wrote a book about this experience in which she incorporated environmental reflections and artwork, titled The Last Straw: A Continuing Quest for Life without Disposable Plastic, which was published in 2018.

Holsenbeck was a North Carolina Arts Council Artist Fellowship Recipient for her work in the visual arts in 1997 and 2001.

Holsenbeck co-founded The Scrap Exchange, a creative reuse nonprofit located in Durham, North Carolina.

== Publications ==
Holsenbeck's book The Last Straw: A Continuing Quest for Life without Disposable Plastic was published by RCWMS in 2018.

In 2019, PBS published a short documentary feature on Holsenbeck, titled "Bryant Holsenbeck: Environmental Artist." Holsenbeck was featured by authors Kristin Schwain and Josephine Stealey in their 2017 book Rooted, Revived, Reinvented: Basketry in America.

In 2009, RCWMS published a fifteen-minute documentary on Holsenbeck created by filmmaker Margaret Morales, titled Blackbirds, Bottle Caps & Broken Records: Environmental Artist Bryant Holsenbeck at Work.
