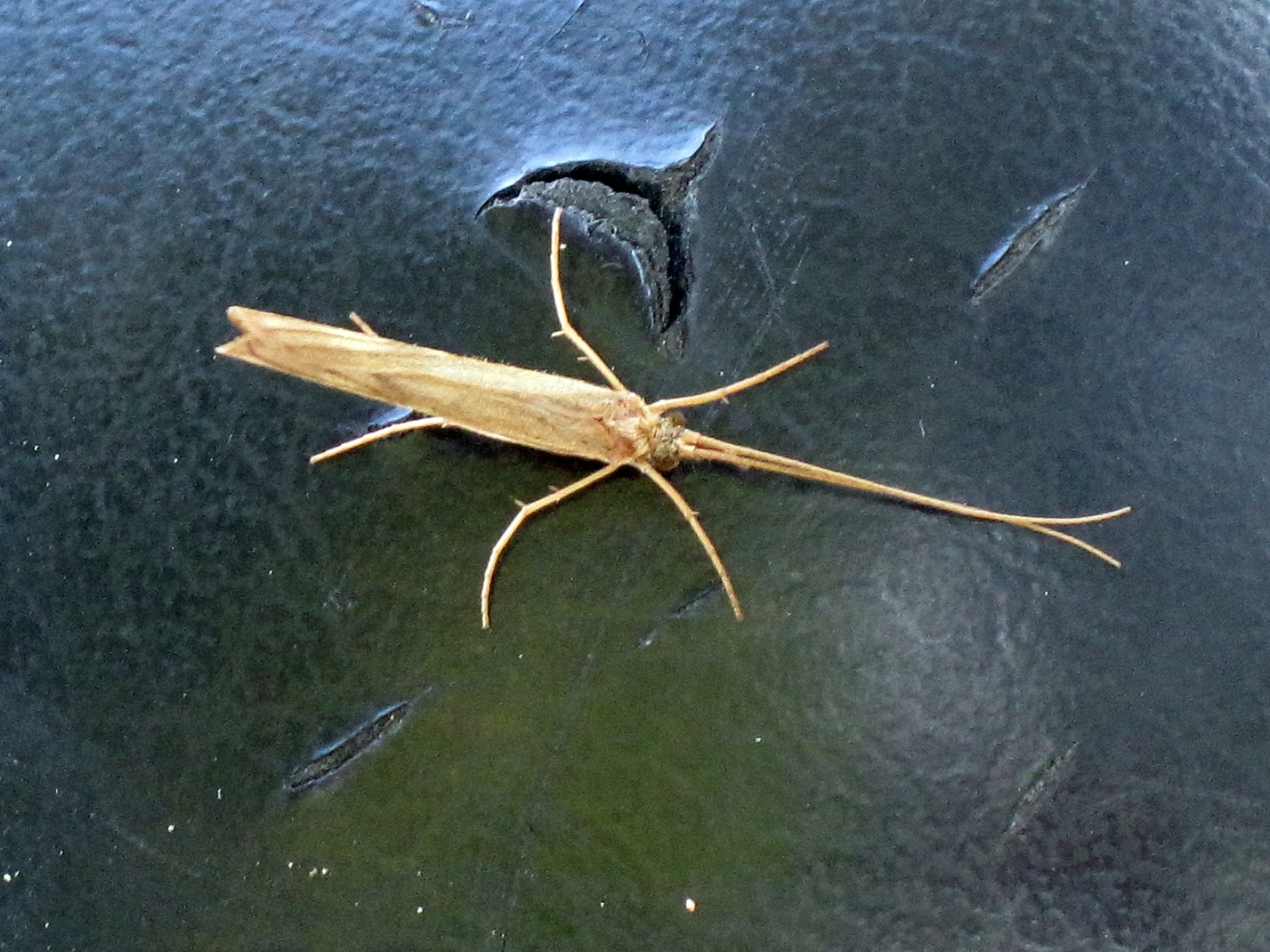
- Molanna angustata

Scientific classification
- Kingdom: Animalia
- Phylum: Arthropoda
- Clade: Pancrustacea
- Class: Insecta
- Order: Trichoptera
- Family: Molannidae
- Genus: Molanna; Curtis, 1834

Subgenera
- Molanna (Molanna) Curtis, 1834; Molanna (Molanneria) Martynov, 1910

= Molanna =

Genus of caddisflies

Molanna is a genus of hood casemakers in the family Molannidae. There are more than 20 described species in Molanna.

== Species ==
These 27 species belong to the genus Molanna:

- Molanna albicans (Zetterstedt, 1840)
- Molanna angustata Curtis, 1834
- Molanna blenda Sibley, 1926
- Molanna byssa
- Molanna cinerea Hagen, 1861
- Molanna crinita Wiggins, 1968
- Molanna cupripennis Ulmer, 1906
- Molanna derosa Cockerell
- Molanna flavicornis Banks, 1914
- Molanna jolandae Neboiss, 1993
- Molanna kunmingensis Hwang, 1957
- Molanna moesta Banks, 1906
- Molanna nervosa Ulmer, 1927
- Molanna nigra (Zetterstedt, 1840)
- Molanna oglamar Malicky & Chantaramongkol, 1989
- Molanna paramoesta Wiggins, 1968
- Molanna saetigera Wiggins, 1968
- Molanna submarginalis McLachlan, 1872
- Molanna taprobane Flint, 1973
- Molanna tryphena Betten, 1934
- Molanna ulmerina Navás, 1934
- Molanna uniophila Vorhies, 1909
- Molanna walgrena Milne, 1934
- Molanna xiaguana Malicky, 1994
- † Molanna crassicornis Ulmer, 1912
- † Molanna megategulae Wichard, 2013
- † Molanna okraina Ivanov & Melnitsky, 2013
