= Molannodes =

Scientific classification
- Kingdom: Animalia
- Phylum: Arthropoda
- Clade: Pancrustacea
- Class: Insecta
- Order: Trichoptera
- Family: Molannidae
- Genus: Molannodes; McLachlan, 1866

Genus of insects

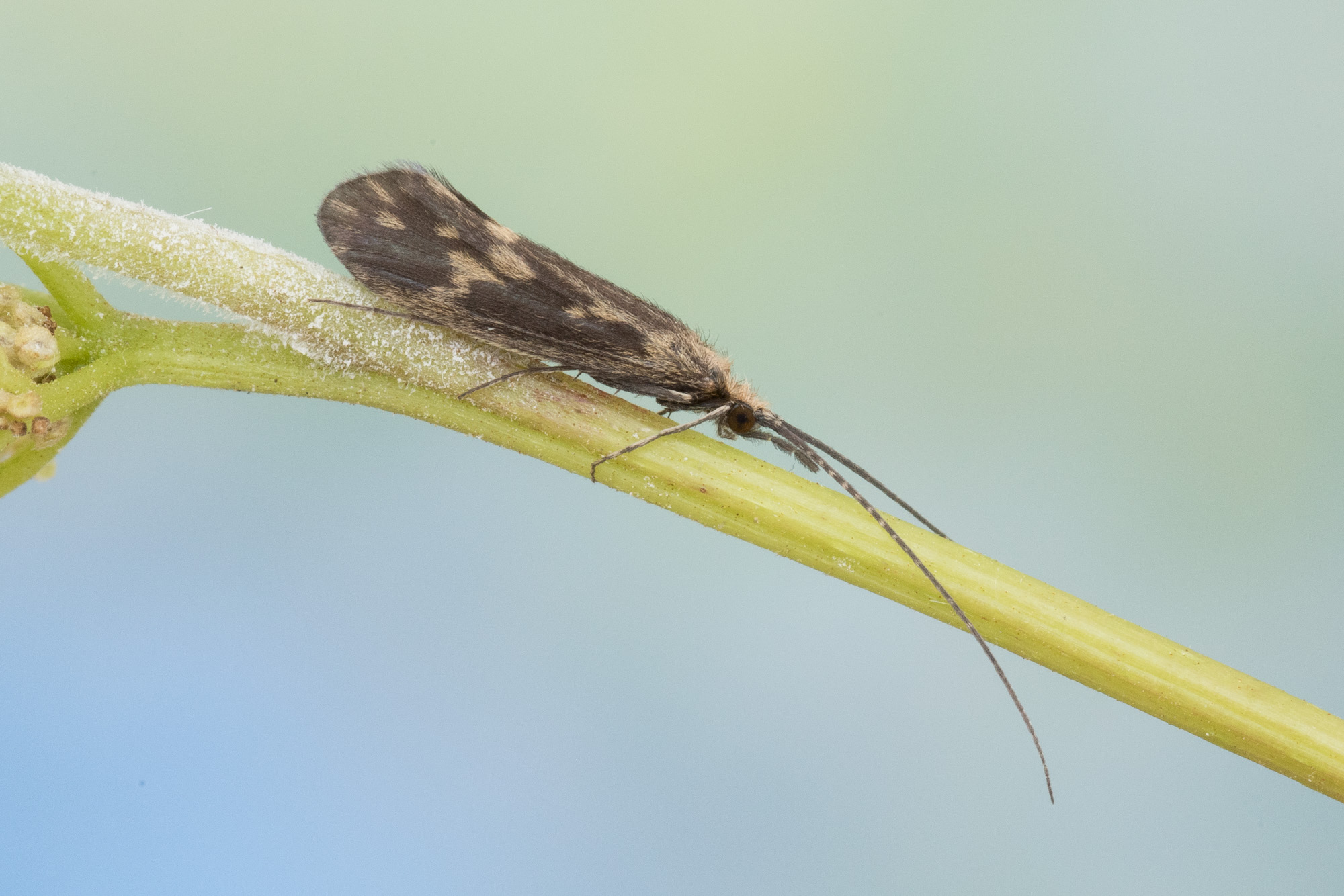

Molannodes is a genus of insects belonging to the family Molannidae.

The species of this genus are found in Europe, Far East Russia and Northern America.

Species:

- Molannodes alticola (Malicky & Chantaramongkol, 1996)
- Molannodes decurvatus (Wiggins, 1968)
