= Biotic index =

Scale on the quality of an environment

A biotic index is a scale for showing the quality of an environment by indicating the types and abundances of organisms present in a representative sample of the environment. It is often used to assess the quality of water in marine and freshwater ecosystems. Numerous biotic indices have been created to account for the indicator species found in each region of study. The concept of the biotic index was developed by Cherie Stephens in an effort to provide a simple measurement of stream pollution and its effects on the biology of the stream.

== Technique ==
To assign a biotic index value to a specific water site, the tester first collects macro invertebrates from portions of the sample area of the stream, river or lake, and separates them into groups of similar-looking organisms. More extensive testing can be done by looking for certain microscopic organisms.

Then an identification key is used to help determine which category or group the organism belongs in and allows a numerical value be assigned to that organism. A worksheet is then used to calculate the final value or score of all the organisms found. Depending upon the worksheet's equations, the score determines the condition of the water quality.

== Usefulness of macro invertebrates ==
Aquatic macro invertebrates have some general characteristics that make them very useful to assess stream health:

1. They are abundant and found in water bodies throughout the world
2. They are not extremely mobile
3. They carry out part or all of their life cycle within the stream or river.

Macro invertebrates limited mobility and extended presence in the water means that they are exposed on a continuous basis to water quality in that stream or river. In particular, many of these organisms breathe dissolved oxygen that is in the water. They are also easier to see at the time of sampling.

Not all the macro invertebrates found in samples are listed on the biotic index scoring sheets. This is because some do not rely on oxygen within the water for survival. Many are able to collect air from the atmosphere and hold a bubble alongside their body to use like a scuba diver uses a tank of oxygen.

For those macro invertebrates that do rely on dissolved oxygen, some can only live in water that has a lot of oxygen. Others can live in water that doesn't have much oxygen dissolved in it at all. Generally, it is assumed that the more pollution there is in the water, the less oxygen.

== Classification ==
The biotic index works by assigning different levels of tolerance to pollution to the different types of organisms. The types of macro invertebrates and other organisms found during sampling are broken into 4 groups:

1. Pollution intolerant: These organisms are highly sensitive to pollution (Stonefly or Alderfly Larva)
2. Semi-Pollution intolerant: These organisms are sensitive to pollution (Dragonfly Larva or Craw fish)
3. Semi-Pollution tolerant: These organisms will be found in clean and slightly polluted waterways (Snails or Black Fly Larva)
4. Pollution tolerant: These organisms will be found in polluted, as well as clean aquatic ecosystems (Leeches, Blood worms)

Some index worksheets combine groups 2 and 3 together, giving only 3 groups. Each group has a number assigned to it and is multiplied by the number of organisms found in that group. This is why identifying the type of organism is important.

== Examples of Biotic Indices ==
- AZTI's Marine Biotic Index
- Extended Biotic Index
- Family Biotic Index
- Hilsenhoff Biotic Index
- Sludge Biotic Index
- Trent Biotic Index

== See also ==
- Bioindicator
- Biological integrity
- Biosurvey
- Index of biological integrity
- Indicator species
- Macroinvertebrate Community Index
