= Juliet Stromberg =

Plant ecologist

Juliet C. Stromberg
- Occupation: Plant ecologist

Academic background
- Education: B.S. in Botany; M.S. in Botany; Ph.D. in Plant Ecology
- Alma mater: University of Wisconsin-Milwaukee; Arizona State University

Juliet C. Stromberg is a plant ecologist. She is a professor emerita at Arizona State University. Her research has examined the relationship of hydrogeomorphic processes such as stream base flows and floods with attributes of riparian vegetation of the American Southwest including population dynamics, species diversity, and community structure and function.

== Education ==
Stromberg completed her B.S. in Botany in 1979 and M.S. in Botany in 1981 from the University of Wisconsin-Milwaukee. She earned her Ph.D. in Plant Ecology with Duncan Patten from Arizona State University in 1988.

== Career ==
Stromberg began her career as an assistant research professor at the Center for Environmental Studies of Arizona State University in 1989. In 1997, she became an associate professor in the Department of Plant Biology and later in the School of Life Sciences at the same institution. She also holds the title of professor emerita. Additionally, she worked on the Arizona Governor's Riparian Area Advisory Committee from 1992 to 1994, on the Arizona Water Protection Fund Board from 1994 to 1996, and on the U.S. Fish and Wildlife Service's Recovery Team for the endangered Southwestern Willow Flycatcher (Empidonax trailii extimus).

== Research ==
Stromberg demonstrated that water regimes and restoration are crucial for maintaining dryland ecosystems' biodiversity. The key rivers she studied included the Bill Williams River, Hassayampa River, and San Pedro River in Arizona and Rush Creek in the Eastern Sierras. Together with Merritt, she classified riparian plants into guilds associated with intermittent, perennial, and ephemeral rivers, concluding that fluvial disturbances and water availability influence vegetation structure. She demonstrated how species richness of riparian vegetation is influenced by flooding and reported the influence of high-flow and low-flow characteristics of surface water on riparian vegetation. Together with Tiller and Richter, she documented how soil moisture availability and groundwater level regulate the distribution of flood plain plant species. Additionally, she carried out an assessment study focusing on the influence of groundwater withdrawals.

Stromberg described the flow regimes that benefit Fremont cottonwood (Populus fremontii) and Goodding's willow (Salix gooddingii), riparian species along Sonoran Desert rivers, and those that favor tamarisk (Tamarix).

Stromberg authored a book titled Ecology and Conservation of the San Pedro River. In this book, she explained aspects of the San Pedro River, including hydrology, biota, human history, and ecological patterns and processes, as well as ongoing scientific and conservation efforts by nonprofits and governments. J. H. Thorp III called this book "well written" and a "scientifically sophisticated book". However, he expressed concern about the title, describing it as "misleading" because the author ignored aquatic ecology. In her other book, Bringing Home the Wild: A Riparian Garden in a Southwest City, she examined an eco-friendly gardening experience in Phoenix, Arizona, using humor and lighthearted language, recognizing the animals that pollinate the plants and the fungi that recycle the organic matter. The book was reviewed by Kristen Rabe, who described the book as an "accessible" and "entertaining narrative" written with "gentle humor".

== Awards and honors ==
- 2023 – George Miksch Sutton Award in Conservation Research, The Southwestern Association of Naturalists
- 2024 – Southwest Book of the Year, Pima County Public Library

== Bibliography ==
=== Books ===
- Stromberg, Juliet C.; Tellman, Barbara (2009). Ecology and Conservation of the San Pedro River. University of Arizona Press. ISBN 978-0-8165-2752-6.
- Stromberg, Juliet C. (2023). Bringing Home the Wild: A Riparian Garden in a Southwest City. University of Arizona Press. ISBN 978-0-8165-5027-2.

=== Selected articles ===
- Stromberg, J. C.; Tiller, R.; Richter, B. (1996). "Effects of groundwater decline on riparian vegetation of semiarid regions: the San Pedro, Arizona". Ecological Applications. 6 (1): 113–131. Bibcode:1996EcoAp...6..113S. doi:10.2307/2269558. JSTOR 2269558.
- Lite, S. J.; Bagstad, K. J.; Stromberg, J. C. (2005). "Riparian plant species richness along lateral and longitudinal gradients of water stress and flood disturbance, San Pedro River, Arizona, USA". Journal of Arid Environments. 63 (4): 785–813. Bibcode:2005JArEn..63..785L. doi:10.1016/j.jaridenv.2005.03.026.
- Lite, S. J.; Stromberg, J. C. (2005). "Surface water and ground-water thresholds for maintaining Populus–Salix forests, San Pedro River, Arizona". Biological Conservation. 125 (2): 153–167. Bibcode:2005BCons.125..153L. doi:10.1016/j.biocon.2005.01.020.
- Stromberg, J. C.; Lite, S. J.; Rychener, T. J.; Levick, L. R.; Dixon, M. D.; Watts, J. M. (2006). "Status of the riparian ecosystem in the upper San Pedro River, Arizona: application of an assessment model". Environmental Monitoring and Assessment. 115 (1): 145–173. Bibcode:2006EMnAs.115..145S. doi:10.1007/s10661-006-6549-1. PMID 16648960.
- Stromberg, J. C.; Chew, M. K.; Nagler, P. L.; Glenn, E. P. (2009). "Changing perceptions of change: the role of scientists in Tamarix and river management". Restoration Ecology. 17 (2): 177–186. Bibcode:2009ResEc..17..177S. doi:10.1111/j.1526-100X.2008.00514.x.
- Stromberg, J. C.; Shafroth, P. B.; Hazelton, A. F. (2012). "Legacies of flood reduction on a dryland river". River Research and Applications. 28 (2): 143–159. Bibcode:2012RivRA..28..143S. doi:10.1002/rra.1449.
- Katz, G. L.; Denslow, M. W.; Stromberg, J. C. (2012). "The Goldilocks effect: intermittent streams sustain more plant species than those with perennial or ephemeral flow". Freshwater Biology. 57 (3): 467–480. Bibcode:2012FrBio..57..467K. doi:10.1111/j.1365-2427.2011.02714.x.
- Stromberg, J. C. (2013). "Root patterns and hydrogeomorphic niches of riparian plants in the American Southwest". Journal of Arid Environments. 94: 1–9. Bibcode:2013JArEn..94....1S. doi:10.1016/j.jaridenv.2013.02.004.
- Stromberg, J. C.; McCluney, K. E.; Dixon, M. D.; Meixner, T. (2013). "Dryland riparian ecosystems in the American Southwest: sensitivity and resilience to climatic extremes". Ecosystems. 16 (3): 411–415. Bibcode:2013Ecosy..16..411S. doi:10.1007/s10021-012-9606-3.
