= Policy advocacy =

Political activity

Policy advocacy is defined as active, covert, or inadvertent support of a particular policy or class of policies. Advocacy can include a variety of activities including, lobbying, litigation, public education, and capacity building (the forming relationships with parties of interest). Advocating for policy can take place from a local level to a state or federal government. For example, a local advocacy group in Brunswick, Georgia, Defenders of Wildlife, advocated for the passage of the H.R. 5552 Migratory Bird Protection Act during 2020 when rollbacks to the bill were introduced from the Trump Administration. At the state level, advocacy for policy can be a joint effort between advocacy groups. In the United States, advocacy groups around the nation planned joint efforts to get the Uniform Partition of Heirs Property Act (UPHPA) signed into law in each of their respective states and in 2018, the bill was signed into law by Texas Governor Greg Abbott making it the tenth state to enforce this law.

== Scientists as policy advocates ==
One controversial area of advocacy is when scientists shift out of the role of scientist and into the role of policy advocate. Scientists, engineers, and other technical experts sometimes also act as policy advocates for their personal policy or their employer's policy preferences. It is common in local, state, and federal governments to find scientists working on policy advocacy. For example, many non-profit groups with a focus on science policy and advocacy in the United States like the National Science Policy Network (NSPN) or Engineers and Scientists Acting Locally (ESAL) provide networks for all career stage professionals in STEM fields to engage in policy advocacy together. Other ways that STEM professionals engage in policy advocacy can be seen as expert witnesses and panel speakers in the United States congressional committee meetings in both the House of Representatives and the Senate, many of which oversee scientific and technological topics such as the House Committee on Science, Space, and Technology or the Senate committee on Energy and Natural Resources. During these committee meetings, lawmakers will gather experts from both public and private sectors to provide insight into the issue at stake and why a policy should or should not be enacted. Policy advocates from across the political spectrum will provide policy advocates who have scientific credentials to pitch their policy preferences.

Providing technical and scientific information to inform policy deliberations in an objective and relevant way is recognized as a difficult problem in many scientific and technical professions. The challenge and conflicts have been studied for those working as stock analysts in brokerage firms, for medical experts testifying in malpractice trials, for funding officers at international development agencies, and for intelligence analysts within governmental national security agencies. The job of providing accurate, relevant, and policy neutral information is especially challenging if highly controversial policy issues (such as climate change) that have a significant scientific component. The use of normative science by scientists is a common method used to subtly advocate for preferred policy choices. Conflict may arise with the administration of a scientific journal when some scientists wish to include their policy preferences in their scientific manuscripts, while editors and other scientists assert that scientific articles ought to remain policy neutral.*Caldwell (2005). "Courting the expert: clash of culture?". British Journal of Haematology. 129 (6): 730–733. doi:10.1111/j.1365-2141.2005.05464.x. PMID 15952998.

== See also ==
- Science policy
- Advocacy
- Advocacy group
- Normative science
- Lobbying (government relations)
- Capacity building
