= Normative science =

Aspect of science

In the applied sciences, normative science is a type of information that is developed, presented, or interpreted based on an assumed, usually unstated, preference for a particular outcome, policy or class of policies or outcomes. Regular or traditional science does not presuppose a policy preference, but normative science, by definition, does. Common examples of such policy preferences are arguments that pristine ecosystems are preferable to human altered ones, that native species are preferable to nonnative species, and that higher biodiversity is preferable to lower biodiversity.

In more general philosophical terms, normative science is a form of inquiry, typically involving a community of inquiry and its accumulated body of provisional knowledge, that seeks to discover good ways of achieving recognized aims, ends, goals, objectives, or purposes. Many political debates revolve around arguments over which of the many "good ways" shall be selected. For example, when presented as scientific information, words such as ecosystem health, biological integrity, and environmental degradation are typically examples of normative science because they each presuppose a policy preference and are therefore a type of policy advocacy.

== See also ==
- Descriptive science
- Environmental policy
- Fact–value distinction
- Is–ought problem
- Normative economics
- Normative ethics
- Policy advocacy
- Truth
