= Corey Tarwater =

American ecologist and ornithologist

Corey Elizabeth Tarwater
- Education: University of California, Davis (BS); University of Illinois, Urbana-Champaign (MS); University of Illinois, Urbana-Champaign (PhD)
- Scientific career
- Awards: American Ornithological Society Ned K. Johnson Young Investigator Award (2013); American Ornithological Society Brina Kessel Award (2020)
- Fields: Ornithology; Behavioral ecology; Evolutionary biology; Conservation biology
- Workplaces: University of California, Berkeley; University of British Columbia, Vancouver; University of Wyoming
- Thesis: The pre-reproductive period in a tropical bird: parental care, dispersal, survival, and avian life histories (2010)
- Doctoral advisor: Jeffrey D. Brawn
- Website: www.uwyo.edu/zoology/people/Tarwater.html

Corey Elizabeth Tarwater is an American ornithologist, behavioral ecologist, and evolutionary and conservation biologist. She is the Robert B. Berry Distinguished Chair in Ecology at the University of Wyoming.

== Education ==
Tarwater received a B.S. in Wildlife, Fish, and Conservation Biology from the University of California, Davis in 1999, an M.S. in Natural Resources and Environmental Sciences from the University of Illinois, Urbana-Champaign in 2006, and a Ph.D. in Ecology, Evolution, and Conservation Biology from the University of Illinois, Urbana-Champaign in 2010. She completed postdoctoral training at the University of California, Berkeley from 2010 through 2012, and the University of British Columbia, Vancouver from 2013 through 2014.

== Research ==
Tarwater has been studying the development of novel ecosystems in Oʻahu, Hawaii since 2014. Her research examines the importance of invasive species in maintaining novel ecosystems. Tarwater additionally leads the Smithsonian Tropical Research Institute's biannual bird census in Panama. She has worked to develop new methods in ornithology, such as the identification of black-crowned antshrikes' ages by their songs. Her research has also examined the effects of climate change, for example by investigating the effectiveness of protected rainforests at limiting biodiversity loss.

== Awards and honors ==
Tarwater received the Ned K. Johnson Early Investigator Award in 2013 and the Brina Kessel Award in 2020, both from the American Ornithological Society. In 2023, she was appointed the Robert B. Berry Distinguished Chair in Ecology at the University of Wyoming.
