= Latent extinction risk =

Potential for a species to become threatened or extinct

In conservation biology, latent extinction risk is a measure of the potential for a species to become threatened.

Latent risk can most easily be described as the difference, or discrepancy, between the current observed extinction risk of a species (typically as quantified by the IUCN Red List) and the theoretical extinction risk of a species predicted by its biological or life history characteristics.

== Calculation ==
Because latent risk is the discrepancy between current and predicted risks, estimates of both of these values are required (See population modeling and population dynamics). Once these values are known, the latent extinction risk can be calculated as Predicted Risk - Current Risk = Latent Extinction Risk.

When the latent extinction risk is a positive value, it indicates that a species is currently less threatened than its biology would suggest it ought to be. For example, a species may have several of the characteristics often found in threatened species, such as large body size, small geographic distribution, or low reproductive rate, but still be rated as "least concern" in the IUCN Red List. This may be because it has not yet been exposed to serious threatening processes such as habitat degradation.

Conversely, negative values of latent risk indicate that a species is already more threatened than its biology would indicate, probably because it inhabits a part of the world where it has been exposed to extreme endangering processes. Species with severely low negative values are usually listed as an endangered species and have associated recovery and conservation plans.

== Limits ==
One of the issues associated with latent extinction risk is its difficulty to calculate because of the limited availability of data for predicting extinction risk across large numbers of species. Hence, the only study of latent risk to date has focused on mammals, which are one of the best-studied groups of organisms.

== Effects on conservation ==
A study of latent extinction risk in mammals identified a number of "hotspots" where the average value of latent risk for mammal species was unusually high. This study suggested that these areas represented an opportunity for proactive conservation efforts, because these could become the "future battlegrounds of mammal conservation" if levels of human impact increase. Unexpectedly, the hotspots of mammal latent risk include large areas of Arctic America, where overall mammal diversity is not high, but where many species have the kind of biological traits (such as large body size and slow reproductive rate) that could render them extinction-prone. Another notable region of high latent risk for mammals is the island chain of Indonesia and Melanesia, where there are large numbers of restricted-range endemic species.

Because it is much more cost-effective to prevent species declines before they happen than to attempt to rescue species from the brink of extinction, latent risk hotspots could form part of a global scheme to prioritize areas for conservation effort, together with other kinds of priority areas such as biodiversity hotspots.
