= Greenprinting =

Greenprinting relates to the conservation of land. Greenprinting is the creation of conservation scenarios that help communities make informed conservation decisions.

Greenprinting can galvanize public support and encourage partners to work toward common conservation goals. Greenprinting often involves use of state-of-the-art maps and models created with Geographic Information System (GIS) software that combines layers of spatial and demographic information to guide growth management efforts.

== Publications ==
- Local Greenprinting for Growth
- The Trust For Public Land - Greenprinting Case Studies
- The Trust for Public Land - Greenprinting for Growth in Texas
- Vision North Texas Greenprinting Project Presentation Jan 27th 2007
- Vision North Texas Greenprinting Project Status Report March 20th 2008
