= Invader potential =

In ecology, invader potential is the qualitative and quantitative measures of a given invasive species probability to invade a given ecosystem. This is often seen through climate matching. There are many reasons why a species may invade a new area. The term invader potential may also be interchangeable with invasiveness. Invader potential is a large threat to global biodiversity. It has been shown that there is an ecosystem function loss due to the introduction of species in areas they are not native to.

Invaders are species that, through biomass, abundance, and strong interactions with native species, have significantly altered the structure and composition of the established community. This differs greatly from the term "introduced", which merely refers to species that have been introduced to an environment, disregarding whether or not they have created a successful establishment. They are simply organisms that have been accidentally, or deliberately, placed into an unfamiliar area. Many times, in fact, species do not have a strong impact on the introduced habitat. This can be for a variety of reasons; either the newcomers are not abundant or because they are small and unobtrusive.

Understanding the mechanisms of invader potential is important to understanding why species relocate and to predict future invasions. There are three predicted reasons as to why species invade an area. They are as follows: adaptation to physical environment, resource competition and/or utilization, and enemy release. Some of these reasons as to why species move seem relatively simple to understand. For example, species may adapt to the new physical environment through having great phenotypic plasticity and environmental tolerance. Species with high rates of these find it easier to adapt to new environments. In terms of resources, those with low resource requirements thrive in unknown areas more than those with complex resource needs. This is shown directly through Tilman's R* rule. Those with less needs can competitively exclude those with more complex needs and take over an area. And finally, species with high reproduction rate and low defense to natural enemies have a better chance of invading other areas. All of these are reasons why species may thrive in places they are non-native to, due to having desirable flexibility within their species' needs.

== Climate matching ==
Climate matching is a technique used to identify extralimital destinations that invasive species may like to overtake, based on its similarities to the species previous native range. Species are more likely to invade areas that match their origin for ease of use, and abundance of resources. Climate matching assesses the invasion risk and heavily prioritizes destination-specific action.

The Bioga irregularis, the brown tree snake, is a great example of a species that climate matches. This species is native to northern and eastern Australia, eastern Indonesia, Papua New Guinea and most of the Solomon Islands. The brown tree snake was accidentally translocated by means of ship cargo to Guam, where it is responsible for replacing the majority of the native bird species.

== Human-mediated invader potential ==
Humans play a significant role in the ways species invade an area. By changing the habitat, an invasion is made easier or more advantageous for an invasive species. As previously mentioned, species are more likely to invade areas they feel they can competitively win in.

As an example, human led shoreline development, specifically in New England, was found to explain over 90% of intermarsh variation. This has boosted nitrogen availability, which can draw in new species. This human made change, among others, was the reason that Phragmites australis invaded the New England salt marshes.

In a study by Sillman and Bertness, 22 salt marshes were surveyed for changes following this invasion. This study specifically looked at how human habitat alteration led to the invasion success of this species. Shoreline development, nutrient enrichment, and salinity reduction were all human made changes that contributed to the species ability to invade.

== Impact and risk assessment ==
It is critical, especially in conservation biology, to have the ability to foresee impacts on ecosystems. For example, the predictions of the identities and ecological impacts of invasive alien species assists in risk assessment. Currently, scientists are lacking the universal and standardized metrics that are reliable enough to predict the likelihood and degree of impact of the specific invaders. Data on the measurable changes in populations of the affected species, for instance, would be especially beneficial.

Invader potential is a tool to aid in this dilemma. By understanding the qualitative and quantitative measures of a given invasive species probability to invade a given ecosystem, researchers can hypothesize which species will impact which environments. The addition, or removal, of a species from an ecosystem can cause drastic changes to environmental factors as well as the community's food web. Predicting these inevitable situations can aid in both maintenance and conservation. This is especially advised for emerging and potential future invaders that have no invasion history.

== Consequences faced by invading species ==
Although the focus is typically on the invading species' adverse impacts on native species, they are also often negatively impacted, as well. The new colonization of a foreign species has proven to lead to introduced species being subject to genetic bottlenecks, random genetic drift, and increased levels of inbreeding. Genetic changes, such as these, can pose a potential threat to allelic diversity. This could lead to genetic differentiation of the introduced population. In addition, invasive organisms face new biotic and abiotic factors.

Invasion potential has a great impact on whether or not the invasive organism will survive these biotic or abiotic factors. The species' ability to adapt to the new conditions will contribute to the success of the particular invasion. In the majority of cases, a small subset of introduced species become invaders as a result of rapid changes in the new habitat. In other cases, the species fails to thrive symbiotically with the ecosystem.

== See also ==
- Invasive species
- Ecological niche
- Ecological metrics
