= Conservation park =

Conservation park may refer to:

- Conservation park (Australia)
- Conservation parks of New Zealand
- Protected area, also called a conservation area
