= Plant Ecology (journal) =

Scientific journal

- Discipline: Plant ecology
- Language: English
- Edited by: Neal J. Enright

Publication details
- Former name: Vegetatio
- History: 1948–present
- Publisher: Springer Science+Business Media
- Frequency: Monthly
- Impact factor: 1.829 (2011)

Standard abbreviations
- ISO 4: Plant Ecol.

Indexing
- ISSN: 1385-0237 (print); 1573-5052 (web)
- OCLC no.: 37915892

Links
- Journal homepage; Online access

Plant Ecology is a scientific journal on plant ecology, formerly known as Vegetatio, a journal whose editors resigned in protest of high pricing. The journal publishes original scientific papers on the ecology of vascular plants and terrestrial and aquatic ecosystems. The editor-in-chief is Neal J. Enright (Murdoch University).

== Abstracting and indexing ==
The journal is abstracted and indexed in Academic OneFile, AGRICOLA, ASFA, Biological Abstracts, BIOSIS, CAB Abstracts, CAB International, ProQuest, Current Contents/Agriculture, Biology & Environmental Sciences, Geobase, Global Health, Science Citation Index, Scopus, and Summon by Serial Solutions. According to the Journal Citation Reports, the journal's 2011 impact factor is 1.829.
