= Ecological health =

Ecological health is a term that has been used in relation to both human health and the condition of the environment.

- In medicine, ecological health has been used to refer to multiple chemical sensitivity, which results from exposure to synthetic chemicals (pesticides, smoke, etc.) in the environment, hence the term ecological.
- The term has also been used in medicine with respect to management of environmental factors (taxes, health insurance surcharges) that may reduce the risk of unhealthy behavior such as smoking.
- As an urban planning term, ecological health refers to the "greenness" of cities, meaning composting, recycling, and energy efficiency.
- With respect to broader environmental issues, ecological health has been defined as "the goal for the condition at a site that is cultivated for crops, managed for tree harvest, stocked for fish, urbanized, or otherwise intensively used."

Ecological health differs from ecosystem health, the condition of ecosystems, which have particular structural and functional properties, and it differs from ecological integrity, which refers to environments with minimal human impact, although the term ecological health has also been used loosely in reference to a range of environmental issues. Human health, in its broadest sense, is recognized as having ecological foundations.

The term health is intended to evoke human environmental health concerns, which are often closely related (but as a part of medicine not ecology). As with ecocide, that term assumes that ecosystems can be said to be alive (see also Gaia philosophy on this issue). While the term integrity or damage seems to take no position on this, it does assume that there is a definition of integrity that can be said to apply to ecosystems. The more political term ecological wisdom refers not only to recognition of a level of health, integrity or potential damage, but also, to a decision to do nothing (more) to harm that ecosystem or its dependents. An ecosystem has a good health if it is capable of self-restoration after suffering external disturbances. This is termed resilience.

== Measurements ==
Measures of broad ecological health, like measures of the more specific principle of biodiversity, tend to be specific to an ecoregion or even to an ecosystem. Measures that depend on biodiversity are valid indicators of ecological health as stability and productivity (good indicators of ecological health) are two ecological effects of biodiversity. Dependencies between species vary so much as to be difficult to express abstractly. However, there are a few universal symptoms of poor health or damage to system integrity:

- The buildup of waste material and the proliferation of simpler life forms (bacteria, insects) that thrive on it - but no consequent population growth in those species that normally prey on them;
- The loss of keystone species, often a top predator, causing smaller carnivores to proliferate, very often overstressing herbivore populations;
- A higher rate of species mortality due to disease rather than predation, climate, or food scarcity;
- The migration of whole species into or out of a region, contrary to established or historical patterns;
- The proliferation of a bioinvader or even a monoculture where previously a more biodiverse species range existed.

== Conservation ==
Some practices such as organic farming, sustainable forestry, natural landscaping, wild gardening or precision agriculture, sometimes combined into sustainable agriculture, are thought to improve or at least not to degrade ecological health, while still keeping land usable for human purposes. This is difficult to investigate as part of ecology, but is increasingly part of discourse on agricultural economics and conservation.

=== Ecotage ===
Ecotage is another tactic thought to be effective by some in protecting the health of ecosystems, but this is hotly disputed. In general, low confrontation and much attention to political virtues is thought to be important to maintaining ecological health, as it is far faster and simpler to destroy an ecosystem than protect it—thus wars on behalf of ecosystem integrity may simply lead to more rapid despoliation and loss due to competition.

=== Deforestation and habitat destruction ===
Deforestation and the habitat destruction of deep-sea coral reef are two issues that prompt deep investigation of what makes for ecological health, and fuels a great many debates. The role of clearcuts, plantations, and trawler nets is often portrayed as negative in the extreme, held akin to the role of weapons on human life. (See Human impact on the environment.)

== See also ==
- Ecosystem health
- EcoHealth
- Natural capital
- Normative science
- Overconsumption
- Overexploitation
- Resilience (ecology)
- Scorched earth
