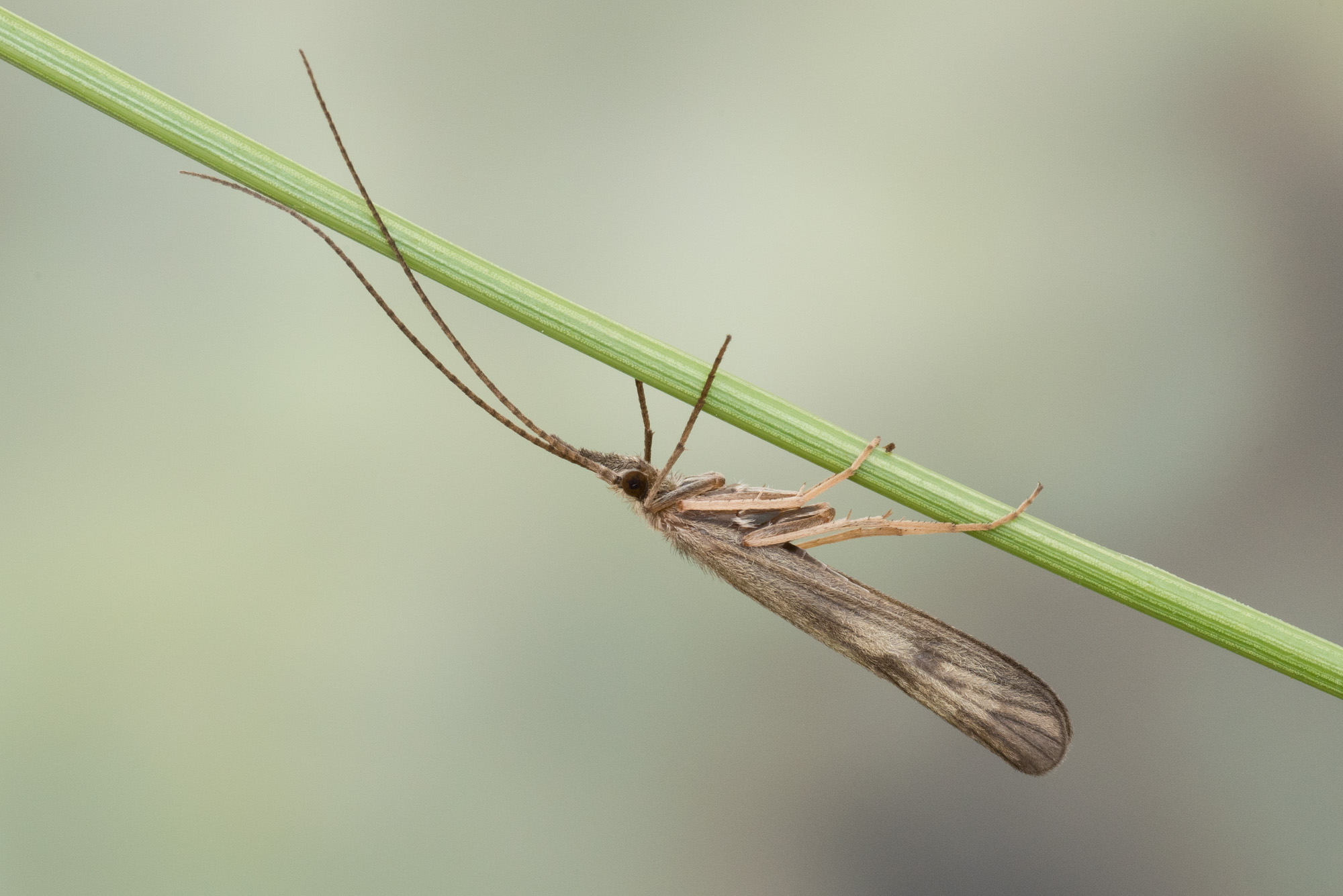

Scientific classification
- Kingdom: Animalia
- Phylum: Arthropoda
- Clade: Pancrustacea
- Class: Insecta
- Order: Trichoptera
- Suborder: Integripalpia
- Family: Molannidae; Wallengren, 1891

= Molannidae =

Family of caddisflies

Molannidae is a family of Hood casemakers in the order Trichoptera. There are at least 3 genera and 40 described species in Molannidae.

The type genus for Molannidae is Molanna J Curtis, 1834.

== Genera ==
- Indomolannodes Wiggins, 1968
- Molanna Curtis, 1834
- Molannodes McLachlan, 1866
