= Biosurvey =

Scientific study of organisms to assess the condition of an ecological resource

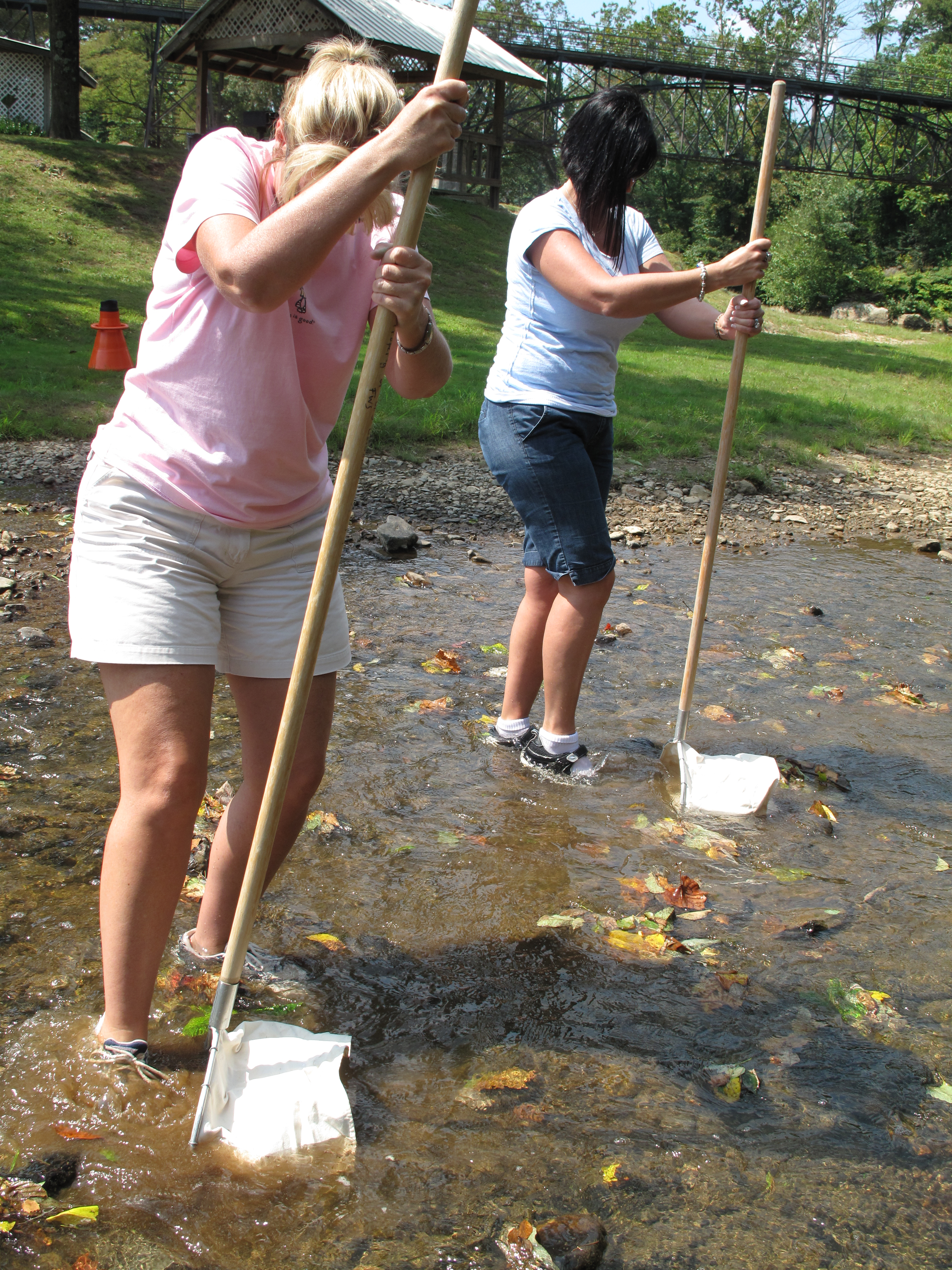
A biosurvey on the North Toe River. North Carolina

A biosurvey, or a biological survey, is a scientific study of organisms to assess the condition of an ecological resource, such as a water body.

== Overview ==
Biosurveys are used by government agencies responsible for management of public lands, environmental planning and/or environmental regulation to assess ecological resources, such as rivers, streams, lakes and wetlands. They involve collection and analysis of animal and/or plant samples which serve as bioindicators. The studies may be conducted by professional scientists or volunteer organizations. They are conducted according to published procedures to ensure consistency in data collection and analysis, and to compare findings to established metrics.

Biosurveys typically use metrics such as species composition and richness (e.g. number of species, extent of pollution-tolerant species), and ecological factors (number of individuals, proportion of predators, presence of disease). Biosurveys may identify pollution problems that are difficult or expensive to detect using chemical testing procedures.

A biosurvey may be used to generate an index of biological integrity (IBI), a scoring system for an ecological resource.

== Water resource biosurveys ==
Protocols for conducting biosurveys of water resources have been published by state government agencies and the U.S. Environmental Protection Agency (EPA). Agencies use these protocols to implement the Clean Water Act. Similar protocols have been published by volunteer organizations.

== See also ==
- Bioassay
- Biological integrity
- Biomonitoring
- Indicator species
- Water pollution
- Water quality
