= Ecosystem health =

Description of the condition of an ecosystem

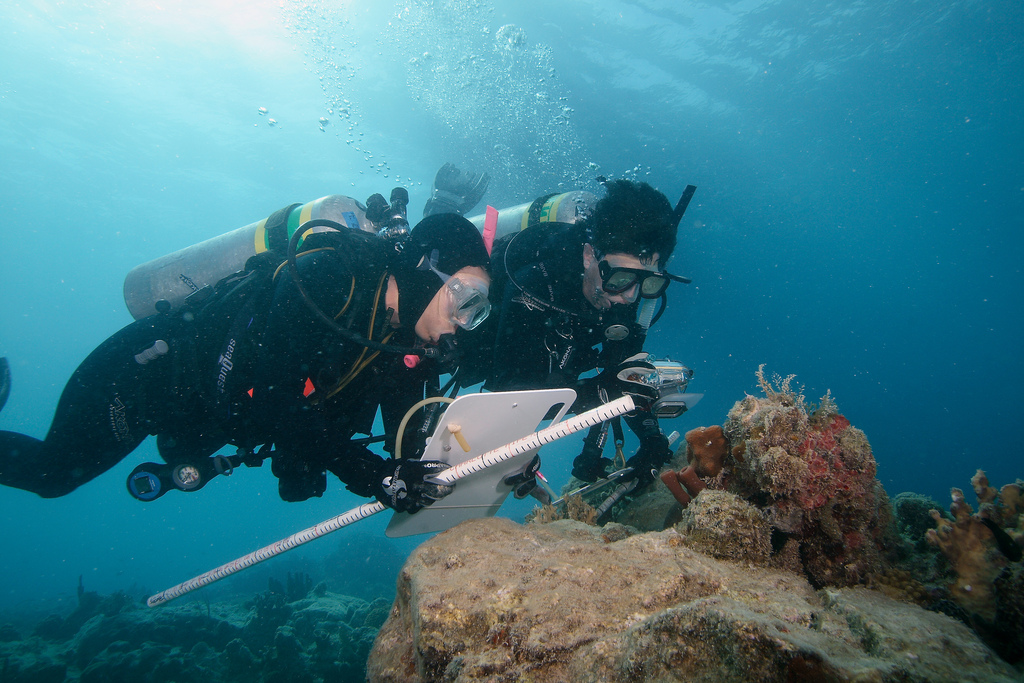
Studying coral health in St. Thomas

Ecosystem health is a metaphor used to describe the condition of an ecosystem. Ecosystem condition can vary as a result of fire, flooding, drought, extinctions, invasive species, climate change, mining, fishing, farming or logging, chemical spills, and a host of other reasons. There is no universally accepted benchmark for a healthy ecosystem, rather the apparent health status of an ecosystem can vary depending upon which health metrics are employed in judging it and which societal aspirations are driving the assessment. Advocates of the health metaphor argue for its simplicity as a communication tool. "Policy-makers and the public need simple, understandable concepts like health." Some critics worry that ecosystem health, a "value-laden construct", can be "passed off as science to unsuspecting policy makers and the public." However, this term is often used in portraying the state of ecosystems worldwide and in conservation and management. For example, scientific journals and the UN often use the terms planetary and ecosystem health, such as the recent journal The Lancet Planetary Health.

== History of the concept ==
The health metaphor applied to the environment has been in use at least since the early 1800s and the great American conservationist Aldo Leopold (1887–1948) spoke metaphorically of land health, land sickness, mutilation, and violence when describing land use practices. The term "ecosystem management" has been in use at least since the 1950s. The term "ecosystem health" has become widespread in the ecological literature, as a general metaphor meaning something good, and as an environmental quality goal in field assessments of rivers, lakes, seas, and forests.

== Meaning ==
The term ecosystem health has been employed to embrace some suite of environmental goals deemed desirable. Edward Grumbine's highly cited paper "What is ecosystem management?" surveyed ecosystem management and ecosystem health literature and summarized frequently encountered goal statements:

- Conserving viable populations of native species;
- Conserving ecosystem diversity;
- Maintaining evolutionary and ecological processes;
- Managing over long time frames to maintain evolutionary potential;
- Accommodating human use and occupancy within these constraints.

Grumbine describes each of these goals as a "value statement" and stresses the role of human values in setting ecosystem management goals.

It is the last goal mentioned in the survey, accommodating humans, that is most contentious. "We have observed that when groups of stakeholders work to define ... visions, this leads to debate over whether to emphasize ecosystem health or human well-being ... Whether the priority is ecosystems or people greatly influences stakeholders' assessment of desirable ecological and social states." and, for example, "For some, wolves are critical to ecosystem health and an essential part of nature, for others they are a symbol of government overreach threatening their livelihoods and cultural values."

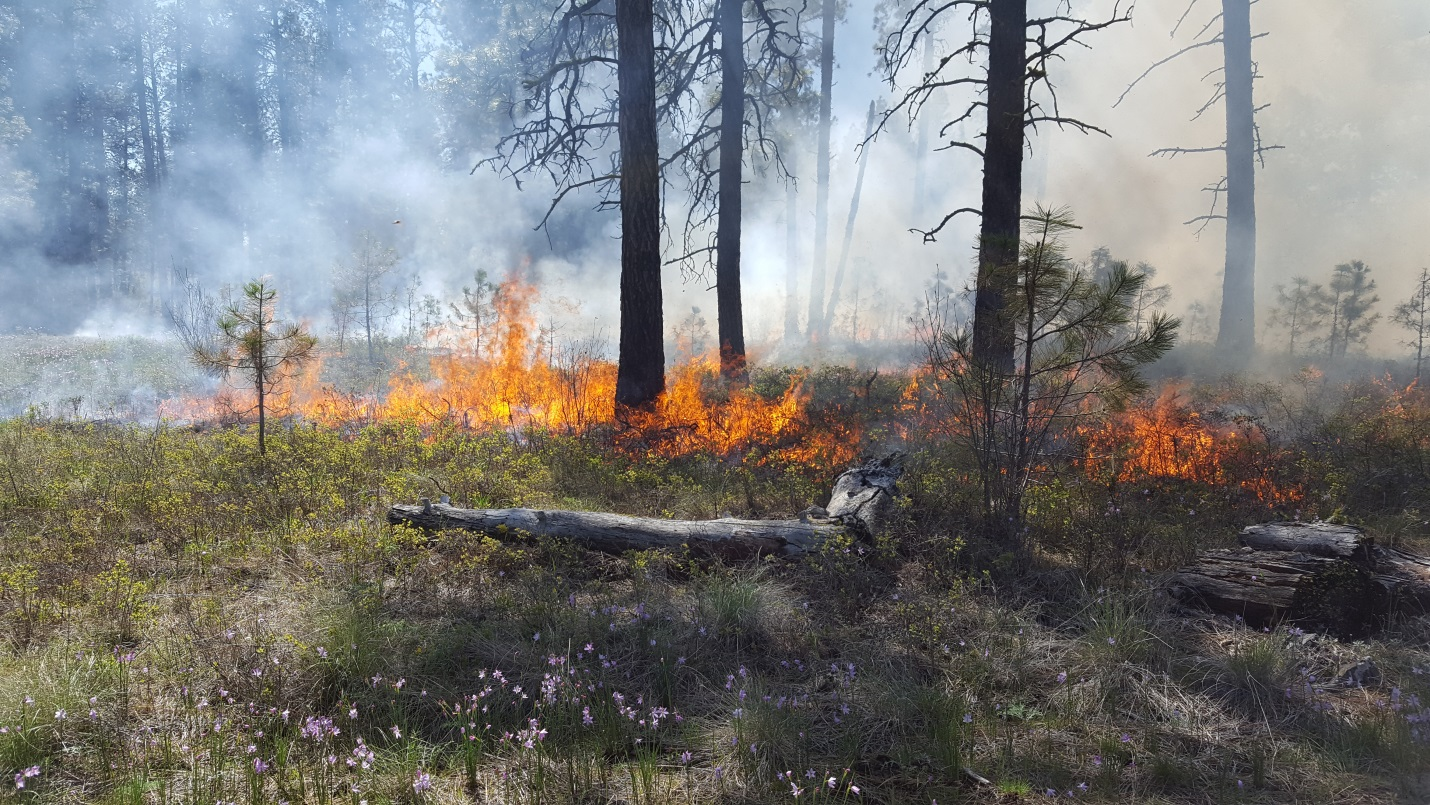
Fire can play a key role in ecosystem restoration.

Measuring ecosystem health requires extensive goal-driven environmental sampling. For example, a vision for ecosystem health of Lake Superior was developed by a public forum and a series of objectives were prepared for protection of habitat and maintenance of populations of some 70 indigenous fish species. A suite of 80 lake health indicators was developed for the Great Lakes Basin including monitoring native fish species, exotic species, water levels, phosphorus levels, toxic chemicals, phytoplankton, zooplankton, fish tissue contaminants, etc.

Some authors have attempted broad definitions of ecosystem health, such as benchmarking as healthy the historical ecosystem state "prior to the onset of anthropogenic stress." A difficulty is that the historical composition of many human-altered ecosystems is unknown or unknowable. Also, fossil and pollen records indicate that the species that occupy an ecosystem reshuffle through time, so it is difficult to identify one snapshot in time as optimum or "healthy.".

A commonly cited broad definition states that a healthy ecosystem has three attributes:

1. productivity,
2. resilience, and
3. "organization" (including biodiversity).

While this captures significant ecosystem properties, a generalization is elusive as those properties do not necessarily co-vary in nature. For example, there is not necessarily a clear or consistent relationship between productivity and species richness. Similarly, the relationship between resilience and diversity is complex, and ecosystem stability may depend upon one or a few species rather than overall diversity. And some undesirable ecosystems are highly productive. "If species richness is our major normative target, then we should convert the Amazon rainforest even faster into pasture."

"Resilience is not desirable per se. There can be highly resilient states of ecosystems which are very undesirable from some human perspectives, such as algal-dominated coral reefs." Ecological resilience is a "capacity" that varies depending upon which properties of the ecosystem are to be studied and depending upon what kinds of disturbances are considered and how they are to be quantified. Approaches to assessing it "face high uncertainties and still require a considerable amount of empirical and theoretical research."

Other authors have sought a numerical index of ecosystem health that would permit quantitative comparisons among ecosystems and within ecosystems over time. One such system employs ratings of the three properties mentioned above: Health = system vigor x system organization x system resilience. Ecologist Glenn Suter argues that such indices employ "nonsense units," the indices have "no meaning; they cannot be predicted, so they are not applicable to most regulatory problems; they have no diagnostic power; effects of one component are eclipsed by responses of other components, and the reason for a high or low index value is unknown."

Clement Loo argues that “if one becomes wedded to one particular guiding concept regarding the key factors … one runs the risk of failing to recognize other more relevant factors.” “There is little reason to suppose … that an account of ecosystem health – particularly one that focuses on as few factors as vigor, structure, and resilience – ought to be able to be particularly useful generally.” And is “failure to recognize how heterogeneous the biological world is.”

"Another way to measure ecosystem health" is using complex systems concepts such as criticality, meaning that a healthy ecosystem is in some sort of balance between adaptability (randomness) and robustness (order) . Nevertheless, the universality of criticality is still under examination and is known as the Criticality Hypothesis, which states that systems in a dynamic regime shifting between order and disorder, attain the highest level of computational capabilities and achieve an optimal trade-off between robustness and flexibility. Recent results in cell and evolutionary biology, neuroscience and computer science have great interest in the criticality hypothesis, emphasizing its role as a viable candidate general law in the realm of adaptive complex systems (see and references therein).

== Health indicators ==
Health metrics are determined by stakeholder goals, which drive ecosystem definition. An ecosystem is an abstraction. "Ecosystems cannot be identified or found in nature. Instead, they must be delimited by an observer. This can be done in many different ways for the same chunk of nature, depending on the specific perspectives of interest."

Ecosystem definition determines the acceptable range of variability (reference conditions) and determines measurement variables. The latter are used as indicators of ecosystem structure and function, and can be used as indicators of "health".

An indicator is a variable, such as a chemical or biological property, that when measured, is used to infer trends in another (unmeasured) environmental variable or cluster of unmeasured variables (the indicandum). For example, rising mortality rate of canaries in a coal mine is an indicator of rising carbon monoxide levels. Rising chlorophyll-a levels in a lake may signal eutrophication.

Ecosystem assessments employ two kinds of indicators, descriptive indicators and normative indicators. "Indicators can be used descriptively for a scientific purpose or normatively for a political purpose."

Used descriptively, high chlorophyll-a is an indicator of eutrophication, but it may also be used as an ecosystem health indicator. When used as a normative (health) indicator, it indicates a rank on a health scale, a rank that can vary widely depending on societal preferences as to what is desirable. A high chlorophyll-a level in a natural successional wetland might be viewed as healthy whereas a human-impacted wetland with the same indicator value may be judged unhealthy.

Estimation of ecosystem health has been criticized for intermingling the two types of environmental indicators. A health indicator is a normative indicator, and if conflated with descriptive indicators "implies that normative values can be measured objectively, which is certainly not true. Thus, implicit values are insinuated to the reader, a situation which has to be avoided."

The very act of selecting indicators of any kind is biased by the observer's perspective and separation of goals from descriptions has been advocated as a step toward transparency: "A separation of descriptive and normative indicators is essential from the perspective of the philosophy of science ... Goals and values cannot be deduced directly from descriptions ... a fact that is emphasized repeatedly in the literature of environmental ethics ... Hence, we advise always specifying the definition of indicators and propose clearly distinguishing ecological indicators in science from policy indicators used for decision-making processes."

And integration of multiple, possibly conflicting, normative indicators into a single measure of "ecosystem health" is problematic. Using 56 indicators, "determining environmental status and assessing marine ecosystems health in an integrative way is still one of the grand challenges in marine ecosystems ecology, research and management".

Another issue with indicators is validity. Good indicators must have an independently validated high predictive value, that is high sensitivity (high probability of indicating a significant change in the indicandum) and high specificity (low probability of wrongly indicating a change). The reliability of various health metrics has been questioned and "what combination of measurements should be used to evaluate ecosystems is a matter of current scientific debate." Most attempts to identify ecological indicators have been correlative rather than derived from prospective testing of their predictive value and the selection process for many indicators has been based upon weak evidence or has been lacking in evidence.

In some cases no reliable indicators are known: "We found no examples of invertebrates successfully used in [forest] monitoring programs. Their richness and abundance ensure that they play significant roles in ecosystem function but thwart focus on a few key species." And, "Reviews of species-based monitoring approaches reveal that no single species, nor even a group of species, accurately reflects entire communities. Understanding the response of a single species may not provide reliable predictions about a group of species even when the group is comprised of a few very similar species."

== Relationship to human health: the health paradox ==
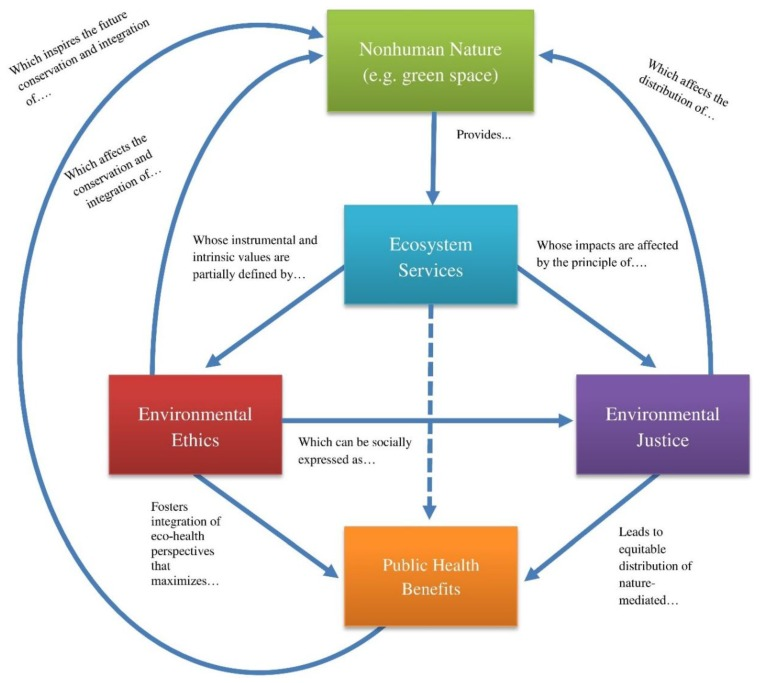
Conceptual map illustrating the connections among nonhuman nature, ecosystem services, environmental ethics, environmental justice, and public health

A trade-off between human health and the "health" of nature has been termed the "health paradox" and it illuminates how human values drive perceptions of ecosystem health. Human health has benefited by sacrificing the "health" of wild ecosystems, such as dismantling and damming of wild valleys, destruction of mosquito-bearing wetlands, diversion of water for irrigation, conversion of wilderness to farmland, timber removal, and extirpation of tigers, whales, ferrets, and wolves.

There has been an acrimonious schism among conservationists and resource managers over the question of whether to "ratchet back human domination of the biosphere" or whether to embrace it. These two perspectives have been characterized as utilitarian vs protectionist.

The utilitarian view treats human health and well-being as criteria of ecosystem health. For example, destruction of wetlands to control malaria mosquitoes "resulted in an improvement in ecosystem health." The protectionist view treats humans as an invasive species: "If there was ever a species that qualified as an invasive pest, it is Homo sapiens."

Proponents of the utilitarian view argue that "healthy ecosystems are characterized by their capability to sustain healthy human populations," and "healthy ecosystems must be economically viable," as it is "unhealthy" ecosystems that are likely to result in increases in contamination, infectious diseases, fires, floods, crop failures and fishery collapse.

Protectionists argue that privileging of human health is a conflict of interest as humans have demolished massive numbers of ecosystems to maintain their welfare, also disease and parasitism are historically normal in pre-industrial nature. Diseases and parasites promote ecosystem functioning, driving biodiversity and productivity, and parasites may constitute a significant fraction of ecosystem biomass.

The very choice of the word "health" applied to ecology has been questioned as lacking in neutrality in a BioScience article on responsible use of scientific language: "Some conservationists fear that these terms could endorse human domination of the planet ... and could exacerbate the shifting cognitive baseline whereby humans tend to become accustomed to new and often degraded ecosystems and thus forget the nature of the past."

== Criticism of the concept and proposed alternatives ==
Criticism of ecosystem health largely targets the failure of proponents to explicitly distinguish the normative (policy preference) dimension from the descriptive (scientific information) dimension, and has included the following:

- Ecosystem health is in the eye of the beholder. It is an economic, political or ethical judgement rather than a scientific measure of environmental quality. Health ratings are shaped by the goals and preferences of environmental stakeholders. "There is no scientific basis for demarcating ecosystem health." "At the core of debates over the utility of ecosystem health is a struggle over which societal preferences will take precedence."
- Ecosystem health is an example of normative science, and "using normative science in policy deliberations is stealth advocacy." "Normative science is a corruption of science and should not be tolerated in the scientific community — without exception."
- Health is a metaphor, not a property of an ecosystem. Health is an abstraction. It implies "good", an optimum condition, but in nature ecosystems are ever-changing transitory assemblages with no identifiable optimum.
- Proponents fail to recognize that “the domain of the biological world is heterogeneous” and critical variables may be ignored in environmental assessments due to the narrow preconception of what constitutes “ecosystem health”.
- Use of human health and well-being as a criterion of ecosystem health introduces an arrogance and a conflict of interest into environmental assessment, as human population growth has caused much environmental damage.
- Ecosystem health masquerades as an operational goal because environmental managers "may be reluctant to define their goals clearly."
- It is a vague concept. It is "undefinable in a rigorous sense and is, therefore, acceptable only as conveying a vague sense of well-being." "Currently there are many, often contradictory, definitions of ecosystem health," that "are open to so much abuse and misuse that they represent a threat to the environment."
- "There are in general no clear definitions of what proponents of the concept mean by 'ecosystem'."
- There is conflicting usage with various government forestry agencies having long had programs or departments of "forest health" meaning absence of tree disease and fire damage, whereas "ecosystem health" may embrace the roles of disease and fire. "Fire is a vital and natural part of the functioning of numerous forest ecosystems."
- The public can be deceived by the term ecosystem health which may camouflage the ramifications of a policy goal and be employed to pejoratively rank policy choices. "The most pervasive misuse of ecosystem health and similar normative notions is insertion of personal values under the guise of 'scientific' impartiality."

Alternatives have been proposed for the term ecosystem health, including more neutral language such as ecosystem status, ecosystem prognosis, and ecosystem sustainability. Another alternative to the use of a health metaphor is to "express exactly and clearly the public policy and the management objective", to employ habitat descriptors and real properties of ecosystems. An example of a policy statement is "The maintenance of viable natural populations of wildlife and ecological functions always takes precedence over any human use of wildlife." An example of a goal is "Maintain viable populations of all native species in situ." An example of a management objective is "Maintain self-sustaining populations of lake whitefish within the range of abundance observed during 1990-99."

Kurt Jax presented an ecosystem assessment format that avoids imposing a preconceived notion of normality, that avoids the muddling of normative and descriptive, and that gives serious attention to ecosystem definition. (1) Societal purposes for the ecosystem are negotiated by stakeholders, (2) a functioning ecosystem is defined with emphasis on phenomena relevant to stakeholder goals, (3) benchmark reference conditions and permissible variation of the system are established, (4) measurement variables are chosen for use as indicators, and (5) the time scale and spatial scale of assessment are decided.

== Related terms ==
Ecological health has been used as a medical term in reference to human allergy and multiple chemical sensitivity and as a public health term for programs to modify health risks (diabetes, obesity, smoking, etc.). Human health itself, when viewed in its broadest sense, is viewed as having ecological foundations. It is also an urban planning term in reference to "green" cities (composting, recycling), and has been used loosely with regard to various environmental issues, and as the condition of human-disturbed environmental sites. Ecosystem integrity implies a condition of an ecosystem exposed to a minimum of human influence. Ecohealth is the relationship of human health to the environment, including the effect of climate change, wars, food production, urbanization, and ecosystem structure and function. Ecosystem management and ecosystem-based management refer to the sustainable management of ecosystems and in some cases may employ the terms ecosystem health or ecosystem integrity as a goal. The practice of natural resource management has evolved as societal priorities have changed and, as a consequence, the working definition of ecosystem health, along with the overall management goals, have evolved as well.
