= Measurement of biodiversity =

Empirical measurement

A variety of objective means exist to empirically measure biodiversity. Each measure relates to a particular use of the data, and is likely to be associated with the variety of genes. Biodiversity is commonly measured in terms of taxonomic richness of a geographic area over a time interval. In order to calculate biodiversity, species evenness, species richness, and species diversity are to be obtained first. Species evenness is the relative number of individuals of each species in a given area. Species richness is the number of species present in a given area. Species diversity is the relationship between species evenness and species richness. There are many ways to measure biodiversity within a given ecosystem. However, the two most popular are Shannon-Weaver diversity index, commonly referred to as Shannon diversity index, and the other is Simpsons diversity index. Although many scientists prefer to use Shannon's diversity index simply because it takes into account species richness.

Biodiversity is usually plotted as the richness of a geographic area, with some reference to a temporal scale. Types of biodiversity include taxonomic or species, ecological, morphological, and genetic diversity. Taxonomic diversity, that is the number of species, genera, family is the most commonly assessed type. A few studies have attempted to quantitatively clarify the relationship between different types of diversity. For example, the biologist Sarda Sahney has found a close link between vertebrate taxonomic and ecological diversity.

Conservation biologists have also designed a variety of objective means to empirically measure biodiversity. Each measure of biodiversity relates to a particular use of the data. For practical conservationists, measurements should include a quantification of values that are commonly shared among locally affected organisms, including humans. For others, a more economically defensible definition should allow the ensuring of continued possibilities for both adaptation and future use by humans, assuring environmental sustainability.

As a consequence, biologists argue that this measure is likely to be associated with the variety of genes. Since it cannot always be said which genes are more likely to prove beneficial, the best choice for conservation is to assure the persistence of as many genes as possible. For ecologists, this latter approach is sometimes considered too restrictive, as it prohibits ecological succession.

== Taxonomic diversity ==
Biodiversity is usually plotted as taxonomic richness of a geographic area, with some reference to a temporal scale. Whittaker described three common metrics used to measure species-level biodiversity, encompassing attention to species richness or species evenness:

- Species richness - the simplest of the indices available.
- Simpson index
- Shannon-Wiener index

More recently, two new indices have been invented. The Mean Species Abundance Index (MSA) calculates the trend in population size of a cross section of the species. It does this in line with the CBD 2010 indicator for species abundance. The Biodiversity Intactness Index (BII) measures biodiversity change using abundance data on plants, fungi and animals worldwide. The BII shows how local terrestrial biodiversity responds to human pressures such as land use change and intensification.

== Other measures of diversity ==
Alternatively, other types of diversity may be plotted against a temporal timescale:

- species diversity
- ecological diversity
- morphological diversity
- genetic diversity

These different types of diversity may not be independent. There is, for example, a close link between vertebrate taxonomic and ecological diversity.

Other authors tried to organize the measurements of biodiversity in the following way:

- traditional diversity measures
  - species density, take into account the number of species in an area
  - species richness, take into account the number of species per individuals (usually [species]/[individuals x area])
  - diversity indices, take into account the number of species (the richness) and their relative contribution (the evenness); e.g.:
    - Simpson index
    - Shannon-Wiener index
- phylogenetic diversity measures, include information on phylogenetic relationships among species
  - phylogenetic diversity (PD) index; Faith (1992)
  - topology based measures
    - taxonomic distinctiveness; Vane-Wright et al. (1991)
    - taxonomic diversity; Warwick & Clarke (1995)
    - taxonomic distinctness; Clarke & Warwick (1998)
- functional diversity measures, include information on functional traits among species
  - categoric measures
    - functional group richness (FGR); e.g., Tilman et al. (1997)
  - continuous measures
    - with only one functional trait; e.g., Mason et al. (2003)
    - multivariate measures, with many functional traits
      - functional attribute diversity (FAD); Walker et al. (1999)
      - convex hull volume; Cornwell et al. (2006)
      - functional diversity (FD); Petchey & Gaston (2002)

== Scale ==
Diversity may be measured at different scales. These are some common indices used by ecologists:

- Alpha diversity refers to diversity within a particular area, community or ecosystem, and is measured by counting the number of taxa within the ecosystem (usually species)
- Beta diversity is species diversity between ecosystems; this involves comparing the number of taxa that are unique to each of the ecosystems.
- Gamma diversity is a measurement of the overall diversity for different ecosystems within a region.
- Zeta diversity refers to the shared species diversity among multiple sites or communities, and it decreases as the number of sites increases.

== See also ==
- Convention on Biological Diversity
- Diversity index
- Global biodiversity
- List of biodiversity databases
- National Biodiversity Network
