= Gamma diversity =

Total species diversity in a landscape

In ecology, gamma diversity (γ-diversity) is the total species diversity in a landscape. The term was introduced by R. H. Whittaker together with the terms alpha diversity (α-diversity) and beta diversity (β-diversity). Whittaker's idea was that the total species diversity in a landscape (γ) is determined by two different things, the mean species diversity in sites at a more local scale (α) and the differentiation among those sites (β). According to this reasoning, alpha diversity and beta diversity constitute independent components of gamma diversity:

γ = α × β

== Scale considerations ==
The area or landscape of interest may be of very different sizes in different situations, and no consensus has been reached on what spatial scales are appropriate to quantify gamma diversity. It has therefore been proposed that the definition of gamma diversity does not need to be tied to a specific spatial scale, but gamma diversity can be measured for an existing dataset at any scale of interest. If results are extrapolated beyond the actual observations, it needs to be taken into account that the species diversity in the dataset generally gives an underestimation of the species diversity in a larger area. The smaller the available sample in relation to the area of interest, the more species that actually exist in the area are not found in the sample. The degree of underestimation can be estimated from a species-area curve.

== Different concepts ==
Researchers have used different ways to define diversity, which in practice has led to different definitions of gamma diversity as well. Often researchers use the values given by one or more diversity indices, such as species richness, the Shannon index or the Simpson index. When the gamma is calculated using the Shannon index of the pooled community it can be exactly decomposed in site-local values corresponding to the Cross-entropy of the site and the pooled communities. In this case, the gamma is additively decomposed by alpha diversity and beta diversity calculated using the Shannon index and the Kullback–Leibler divergence. However, it has been argued that it would be better to use the effective number of species as the universal measure of species diversity. This measure allows weighting rare and abundant species in different ways, just as the diversity indices collectively do, but its meaning is intuitively easier to understand. The effective number of species is the number of equally abundant species needed to obtain the same mean proportional species abundance as that observed in the dataset of interest (where all species may not be equally abundant).

== Calculation ==
Suppose species diversity is equated with the effective number of species in a dataset. Then gamma diversity can be calculated by first taking the weighted mean of species proportional abundances in the dataset, and then taking the inverse of this mean. The equation is

$${}^q\!D_\gamma = \frac 1 {\sqrt[q-1]{\sum_{i=1}^S p_i p_i^{q-1}}}.$$

The denominator equals mean proportional species abundance in the dataset as calculated with the weighted generalized mean with exponent q − 1. In the equation, S is the total number of species (species richness) in the dataset, and the proportional abundance of the ith species is $p_i$.

Large values of q lead to smaller gamma diversity than small values of q, because increasing q increases the weight given to those species with the highest proportional abundance, and fewer equally abundant species are hence needed to obtain this proportional abundance.

== See also ==
- Alpha diversity
- Beta diversity
- Zeta diversity
- Diversity index
- Global biodiversity
- Measurement of biodiversity
- Species richness
