= Systematics =

Branch of biology

A comparison of phylogenetic and phenetic (character-based) concepts

Systematics is the study of the diversification of living forms, both past and present, and the relationships among living things through time. Relationships are visualized as evolutionary trees (synonyms: phylogenetic trees, phylogenies). Phylogenies have two components: branching order (showing group relationships, graphically represented in cladograms) and branch length (showing amount of evolution). Phylogenetic trees of species and higher taxa are used to study the evolution of traits (e.g., anatomical or molecular characteristics) and the distribution of organisms (biogeography). Systematics, in other words, is used to understand the evolutionary history of life on Earth.

The word systematics is derived from the Latin word of Ancient Greek origin systema, which means systematic arrangement of organisms. Carl Linnaeus used 'Systema Naturae' as the title of his book.

== Branches and applications ==
In the study of biological systematics, researchers use the different branches to further understand the relationships between differing organisms. These branches are used to determine the applications and uses for modern day systematics.

Biological systematics classifies species by using three specific branches. Numerical systematics, or biometry, uses biological statistics to identify and classify animals. Biochemical systematics classifies and identifies animals based on the analysis of the material that makes up the living part of a cell—such as the nucleus, organelles, and cytoplasm. Experimental systematics identifies and classifies animals based on the evolutionary units that comprise a species, as well as their importance in evolution itself. Factors such as mutations, genetic divergence, and hybridization all are considered evolutionary units.

With the specific branches, researchers are able to determine the applications and uses for modern-day systematics. These applications include:

- Studying the diversity of organisms and the differentiation between extinct and living creatures. Biologists study the well-understood relationships by making many different diagrams and "trees" (cladograms, phylogenetic trees, phylogenies, etc.).
- Including the scientific names of organisms, species descriptions and overviews, taxonomic orders, and classifications of evolutionary and organism histories.
- Explaining the biodiversity of the planet and its organisms. The systematic study is that of conservation.
- Manipulating and controlling the natural world. This includes the practice of 'biological control', the intentional introduction of natural predators and disease.

== Definition and relation with taxonomy ==
John Lindley provided an early definition of systematics in 1830, although he wrote of "systematic botany" rather than using the term "systematics".

In 1970 Michener et al. defined "systematic biology" and "taxonomy" (terms that are often confused and used interchangeably) in relationship to one another as follows:

Systematic biology (hereafter called simply systematics) is the field that (a) provides scientific names for organisms, (b) describes them, (c) preserves collections of them, (d) provides classifications for the organisms, keys for their identification, and data on their distributions, (e) investigates their evolutionary histories, and (f) considers their environmental adaptations. This is a field with a long history that in recent years has experienced a notable renaissance, principally with respect to theoretical content. Part of the theoretical material has to do with evolutionary areas (topics e and f above), the rest relates especially to the problem of classification. Taxonomy is that part of Systematics concerned with topics (a) to (d) above.

The term "taxonomy" was coined by Augustin Pyramus de Candolle while the term "systematic" was coined by Carl Linnaeus the father of taxonomy.

Taxonomy, systematic biology, systematics, biosystematics, scientific classification, biological classification, phylogenetics: At various times in history, all these words have had overlapping, related meanings. However, in modern usage, they can all be considered synonyms of each other.

Europeans tend to use the terms "systematics" and "biosystematics" for the study of biodiversity as a whole, whereas North Americans tend to use "taxonomy" more frequently. However, taxonomy, and in particular alpha taxonomy, is more specifically the identification, description, and naming (i.e. nomenclature) of organisms, while "classification" focuses on placing organisms within hierarchical groups that show their relationships to other organisms. All of these biological disciplines can deal with both extinct and extant organisms.

Systematics uses taxonomy as a primary tool in understanding, as nothing about an organism's relationships with other living things can be understood without it first being properly studied and described in sufficient detail to identify and classify it correctly. Scientific classifications are aids in recording and reporting information to other scientists and to laymen. The systematist, a scientist who specializes in systematics, must, therefore, be able to use existing classification systems, or at least know them well enough to skillfully justify not using them.

Phenetics was an attempt to determine the relationships of organisms through a measure of overall similarity, making no distinction between plesiomorphies (shared ancestral traits) and apomorphies (derived traits). From the late-20th century onwards, it was superseded by cladistics, which rejects plesiomorphies in attempting to resolve the phylogeny of Earth's various organisms through time. Today's systematists generally make extensive use of molecular biology and of computer programs to study organisms.

== Taxonomic characters ==
Taxonomic characters are the taxonomic attributes that can be used to provide the evidence from which relationships (the phylogeny) between taxa are inferred. Kinds of taxonomic characters include:

- Morphological characters
  - General external morphology
  - Special structures (e.g. genitalia)
  - Internal morphology (anatomy)
  - Embryology
  - Karyology and other cytological factors
- Physiological characters
  - Metabolic factors
  - Body secretions
  - Genic sterility factors
- Molecular characters
  - Immunological distance
  - Electrophoretic differences
  - Amino acid sequences of proteins
  - DNA hybridization
  - DNA and RNA sequences
  - Restriction endonuclease analyses
  - Other molecular differences
- Behavioral characters
  - Courtship and other ethological isolating mechanisms
  - Other behavior patterns
- Ecological characters
  - Habit and habitats
  - Food
  - Seasonal variations
  - Parasites and hosts
- Geographic characters
  - General biogeographic distribution patterns
  - Sympatric-allopatric relationship of populations

== See also ==
- Evolutionary systematics – a school of systematics
- Global biodiversity
- 16S ribosomal RNA – an intensively studied nucleic acid that has been useful in phylogenetics
- Phylogenetic comparative methods – use of evolutionary trees in other studies, such as biodiversity, comparative biology. adaptation, or evolutionary mechanisms
- Lichen systematics
