= Alpha diversity =

Diversity of species at a local scale

In ecology, alpha diversity (α-diversity) is the mean species diversity in a site at a local scale. The term was introduced by R. H. Whittaker together with the terms beta diversity (β-diversity) and gamma diversity (γ-diversity). Whittaker's idea was that the total species diversity in a landscape (gamma diversity) is determined by two different things, the mean species diversity in sites at a more local scale (alpha diversity) and the differentiation among those sites (beta diversity).

== Scale considerations ==
Both the area and landscape of interest and the sites within it may be of very different sizes in different situations, and no consensus has been reached on what spatial scales are appropriate to quantify alpha diversity. It has therefore been proposed that the definition of alpha diversity does not need to be tied to a specific spatial scale: alpha diversity can be measured for an existing dataset that consists of subunits at any scale. The subunits can be, for example, sampling units that were already used in the field when carrying out the inventory, or grid cells that are delimited just for the purpose of analysis. If results are extrapolated beyond the actual observations, it needs to be taken into account that the species diversity in the subunits generally gives an underestimation of the species diversity in larger areas.

== Different concepts ==
Ecologists have used several slightly different definitions of alpha diversity. Whittaker himself used the term both for the species diversity in a single subunit and for the mean species diversity in a collection of subunits. It has been argued that defining alpha diversity as a mean across all relevant subunits is preferable, because it agrees better with Whittaker's idea that total species diversity consists of alpha and beta components.

Definitions of alpha diversity can also differ in what they assume species diversity to be. Often researchers use the values given by one or more diversity indices, such as species richness (which is simply a count of species), the Shannon index or the Simpson index (which take into account also species proportional abundances). However, it has been argued that it would be better to use the effective number of species as the universal measure of species diversity. This measure allows weighting rare and abundant species in different ways, just as the diversity indices collectively do, but its meaning is intuitively easier to understand. The effective number of species is the number of equally-abundant species needed to obtain the same mean proportional species abundance as that observed in the dataset of interest (where all species may not be equally abundant).

== Calculation ==
Suppose species diversity is equated with the effective number of species, and alpha diversity with the mean species diversity per subunit. Then alpha diversity can be calculated in two different ways that give the same result. The first approach is to calculate a weighted generalized mean of the within-subunit species proportional abundances, and then take the inverse of this mean. The second approach is to calculate the species diversity for each subunit separately, and then take a weighted generalized mean of these.

If the first approach is used, the equation is:

$${}^q\!D_{\alpha}=\dfrac{1}{\sqrt[q-1]{\sum_{j=1}^N{\sum_{i=1}^S p_{ij} p_{i|j}^{q-1}}}}$$

In the equation, N is the total number of subunits and S is the total number of species (species richness) in the dataset. The proportional abundance of the ith species in the jth subunit is $p_{i|j}$. These proportional abundances are weighted by the proportion of data that each subunit contributes to the dataset, $p_{ij} = m_{j}/m$, where $m$ is the total number of individuals in the dataset, and $m_j$ is the total number of individuals in subunit j. The denominator hence equals the mean proportional species abundance within the subunits (mean $p_{i|j}$) as calculated with the weighted generalized mean with exponent q - 1.

If the second approach is used, the equation is:

$${}^q\!D_{\alpha}=\sqrt[1-q]{\sum_{j=1}^N w_j ({}^q\!D_{\alpha j})^{1-q}}$$

This also equals a weighted generalized mean but with exponent 1 - q. Here the mean is taken of the ^{q}D_{αj} values, each of which represents the effective species density (species diversity per subunit) in one subunit j. The nominal weight of the jth subunit is $w_j$, which equals the proportion of data that the subunit contributes to the dataset.

Large values of q lead to smaller alpha diversity than small values of q, because increasing q increases the effective weight given to those species with the highest proportional abundance and to those subunits with the lowest species diversity.

== Examples ==
Alpha diversity can be calculated in both extinct and extant landscapes.

=== Examples of extinct alpha diversity studies ===
- The survival of amphibians and reptiles communities through the Permian-Triassic Extinction
- The reorganization of Ordovician benthic marine communities

=== Examples of extant alpha diversity studies ===
- High tree diversity in throughout the Amazon Rainforests of Ecuador

== See also ==
- Beta diversity
- Dark diversity
- Diversity index
- Gamma diversity
- Zeta diversity
- Global biodiversity
- Measurement of biodiversity
- Phylogenetic diversity
