= Beta diversity =

Ratio of regional to local species diversity in ecology

In ecology, beta diversity (β-diversity or true beta diversity) is the ratio between regional and local species diversity. The term was introduced by R. H. Whittaker together with the terms alpha diversity (α-diversity) and gamma diversity (γ-diversity). The idea was that the total species diversity in a landscape (γ) is determined by two different things: the mean species diversity at the local level (α) and the differentiation among local sites (β). Other formulations for beta diversity include "absolute species turnover", "Whittaker's species turnover" and "proportional species turnover".

Whittaker proposed several ways of quantifying differentiation, and subsequent generations of ecologists have invented more. As a result, there are now many defined types of beta diversity. Some use beta diversity to refer to any of several indices related to compositional heterogeneity. Confusion is avoided by using distinct names for other formulations.

Beta diversity as a measure of species turnover overemphasizes the role of rare species as the difference in species composition between two sites or communities is likely reflecting the presence and absence of some rare species in the assemblages. Beta diversity can also be a measure of nestedness, which occurs when species assemblages in species-poor sites are a subset of the assemblages in more species-rich sites. Moreover, pairwise beta diversity are inadequate in building all biodiversity partitions (some partitions in a Venn diagram of 3 or more sites cannot be expressed by alpha and beta diversity). Consequently, some macroecological and community patterns cannot be fully expressed by alpha and beta diversity. Due to these two reasons, a new way of measuring species turnover, coined Zeta diversity (ζ-diversity), has been proposed and used to connect all existing incidence-based biodiversity patterns.

== Types ==
=== Whittaker beta diversity ===
Gamma diversity and alpha diversity can be calculated directly from species inventory data. The simplest of Whittaker's original definitions of beta diversity is

β = γ/α

Here gamma diversity is the total species diversity of a landscape and alpha diversity is the mean species diversity per site. Because the limits among local sites and landscapes are diffuse and to some degree subjective, it has been proposed that gamma diversity can be quantified for any inventory dataset and that alpha and beta diversity can be quantified whenever the dataset is divided into subunits. Then gamma diversity is the total species diversity in the dataset and alpha diversity the mean species diversity per subunit. Beta diversity quantifies how many subunits there would be if the total species diversity of the dataset and the mean species diversity per subunit remained the same, but the subunits shared no species.

=== Absolute species turnover ===
Some researchers have preferred to partition gamma diversity into additive rather than multiplicative components. Then the beta component of diversity becomes

β_{A} = γ - α

This quantifies how much more species diversity the entire dataset contains than an average subunit within the dataset. This can also be interpreted as the total amount of species turnover among the subunits in the dataset. If the gamma diversity correspond to the average cross-entropy and the alpha diversity corresponds to the average Shannon index than beta is equal to the average Kullback–Leibler divergence.

When there are two subunits, and presence-absence data are used, this can be calculated with the following equation:

$\beta_A=(S_1-c)+(S_2-c)$

where, S_{1}= the total number of species recorded in the first community, S_{2}= the total number of species recorded in the second community, and c= the number of species common to both communities.

=== Whittaker's species turnover ===
If absolute species turnover is divided by alpha diversity, a measure is obtained that quantifies how many times the species composition changes completely among the subunits of the dataset. This measure was proposed by Whittaker, so it has been called Whittaker's species turnover. It is calculated as

β_{W} = (γ - α)/α = γ/α - 1

When there are two subunits, and presence-absence data are used, this equals the one-complement of the Sørensen similarity index.

=== Proportional species turnover ===
If absolute species turnover is divided by gamma diversity, a measure is obtained that quantifies what proportion of the species diversity in the dataset is not contained in an average subunit. It is calculated as

β_{P} = (γ - α)/γ = 1 - α/γ

When there are two subunits, and presence-absence data are used, this measure as ranged to the interval [0, 1] equals the one-complement of the Jaccard similarity index.

== β-diversity patterns ==
Grain size changes the relationship between tree beta-diversity and latitude. See Sreekar et al.

Although understanding the change in species composition from local to regional scales (β-diversity) is a central theme in ecology and biogeography, studies often reached different conclusions as to the fundamental patterns in β-diversity. For example, niche compression hypothesis predicted higher β-diversity at lower latitudes. Studies comparing natural local sites with human-modified local sites are no different. Kitching et al. sampled moths in primary and logged forests of Danum valley, Borneo to show that β-diversity in primary forests was higher than logged forests. Contrastingly, Berry et al. sampled trees in the same study area to show that β-diversity in logged forests was higher than primary forests. The results of these two studies were completely different from the results of a recent quantitative synthesis, which showed that β-diversity in primary forests were similar to β-diversity in all types of human-modified local sites (secondary forests, plantations, pasture and urban). Therefore, there is a clear lack of consensus on β-diversity patterns among studies. Sreekar et al. suggested that most of these inconsistencies were due to the differences in grain size and/or spatial extent among studies. They showed that spatial scale changes the relationship between β-diversity and latitude.

== Diversity partitioning in the geologic past ==
Major diversification events in the geologic past were associated with shifts in the relative contributions of alpha- and beta-diversity (diversity partitioning). Examples include the Cambrian explosion, the great Ordovician biodiversification event, and the recoveries from the end-Permian and end-Triassic mass extinction events. Empirical data from these case studies confirm theoretical predictions that an increasing number of species will increase beta-diversity relative to alpha diversity because of the effects from interspecific competition; yet, alpha diversity may increase again once options for increasing geographic turnover are exhausted.

== See also ==
- Alpha diversity
- Biotic homogenization
- Bray–Curtis dissimilarity
- Dark diversity
- Diversity index
- Gamma diversity
- Global biodiversity
- Jaccard distance
- Measurement of biodiversity
- Zeta diversity
