= Wolfgang H. Berger =

American paleontologist

Wolfgang "Wolf" Helmut Berger (5 October 1937, Erlangen – 6 August 2017 San Diego, California) was a German-American oceanographer, geologist, micropaleontologist and emeritus professor at Scripps Institution of Oceanography and the University of California, San Diego. His research interests comprise "micropaleontology, marine sedimentation, ocean productivity, carbon cycle, ocean history, climate history, and history of oceanography."

== Education and career ==
Berger earned in 1961 his Vordiplom degree in geology at the University of Erlangen and in 1963 his master's degree in geology at the University of Colorado in Boulder. In 1968 he received his PhD in oceanography from the University of California, San Diego (UCSD). From 1968 to 1970 he did research at the UCSD's Scripps Institution of Oceanography, and in 1970/1971 he was an Assistant at the Geological Institute of the University of Kiel. In 1971 he became an assistant professor, in 1974 an associate professor, and then in 1981 a professor at the Scripps Institution, where he was in 1996/1997 the interim director. In 1997 Berger became the director of the California Space Institute in San Diego. In 1977 and in 1980 he was a visiting professor at the University of Kiel. In 1987 he did research at the University of Bremen.

His research was especially concerned with the ecology of planktonic foraminifera and the reconstruction of the climate and the marine environment of the Cenozoic.

The Berger–Parker index is named after Berger and Frances Lawrence Parker.

Berger was a Fellow of the American Association for the Advancement of Science, the American Geophysical Union, and the Geological Society of America.

== Awards and honors ==
- 1979 – Bigelow Medal, Woods Hole Oceanographic Institute
- 1980 – Norwegian Research Fellow
- 1984 – A.G. Huntsman Award for Excellence in the Marine Sciences, Bedford Institute of Oceanography
- 1986 – Lady Davis Fellow, Hebrew University
- 1986 – Humboldt Award, presented in Bonn
- 1988 – Maurice Ewing Medal, presented in San Francisco
- 1991 – Prince Albert I Medal, presented in Paris
- 1993 – Balzan Prize, presented in Bern
- 1998 – Gustav-Steinmann-Medaille, presented in Bern
- 2001 – Foreign Member, Academia Europaea
- 2012 - EGU Milutin Milankovic Medal, presented in Vienna

== Selected works ==
- Berger, W. H.; Parker, F. L. (1970). "Diversity of Planktonic Foraminifera in Deep-Sea Sediments". Science. 168 (3937): 1345–7. Bibcode:1970Sci...168.1345B. doi:10.1126/science.168.3937.1345. PMID 17731043. S2CID 29553922.
- with L. D. Labeyrie (ed.): Abrupt climatic change: evidence and implications. Dordrecht; Boston: D. Reidel. 1987. ISBN 90-277-2604-3.
- with Eugen Seibold: The sea floor: an introduction to marine geology, Springer 1982, 3rd edition 1996
- Jackson, J. B. C. (2001). "Historical Overfishing and the Recent Collapse of Coastal Ecosystems". Science. 293 (5530): 629–637. doi:10.1126/science.1059199. PMID 11474098. S2CID 1459898.
- Berger, W. H. (2002). "Climate History and the Great Geophysical Experiment". Climate Development and History of the North Atlantic Realm. pp. 1–16. doi:10.1007/978-3-662-04965-5_1. ISBN 978-3-642-07744-9.
- Berger, W. H. (2007). "On the discovery of the ice age: Science and myth". Geological Society, London, Special Publications. 273 (1): 271–278. Bibcode:2007GSLSP.273..271B. doi:10.1144/GSL.SP.2007.273.01.21. S2CID 128710191.
- Ocean: reflections on a century of exploration. University of California Press. 2009. ISBN 9780520942547.
- Berger, W. H.; Winterer, E. L. (2009). "Plate Stratigraphy and the Fluctuating Carbonate Line". Pelagic Sediments: On Land and under the Sea. p. 11. doi:10.1002/9781444304855.ch2. ISBN 9781444304855.
