= Species evenness =

Relative abundance of different species within a community or ecosystem

Species evenness describes the commonness or rarity of a species; it requires knowing the abundance of each species relative to those of the other species within the community. Abundance values can be difficult to obtain. Area-based counts, distance methods, and mark and recapture studies are the three general categories of methods for estimating abundance.

Species evenness is combined with species richness, (the number of species in the community), in order to determine species diversity, which is an important measure of community structure. Community structure in turn provides the quantitative basis needed to create hypotheses and experiments that help to increase understanding of how communities work.

To demonstrate the contributions of species richness and species evenness to species diversity, consider the following hypothetical example, in which there are two meadow communities, each containing four species of butterflies. Hence, both communities have the same butterfly species richness, however their species evenness differs. In community A, one of the species constitutes 80% of the individuals in the community, while the remaining three species comprise only 20% of the individuals in the community. In community B, the number of individuals are evenly divided among the four species, (25% each). Therefore, community A has lower species evenness than community B. When comparing the two communities, even though each has the same species richness of four species, community B has the higher species diversity because it has higher species evenness.

The Shannon index is the most commonly used way to quantitatively determine species diversity, H, as modeled by the following equation:

$H = - \sum_{i=1}^S {p_{i}} \ln {(p_{i})}$

The Shannon index factors in both species evenness and species richness, as represented by the variables p_{i} and s, respectively. The lowest possible value of H is zero, and the higher a community’s H value, the greater its species diversity. If calculated for each of the two hypothetical butterfly communities described previously, the lower Shannon index value (H) would belong to community A, thereby confirming mathematically that this community has lower species diversity than community B. Furthermore, given that both communities have the same species richness, it is the lower species evenness in community A that drives the difference in species diversity.

== See also ==
- Biodiversity
