= Phylogenetic diversity =

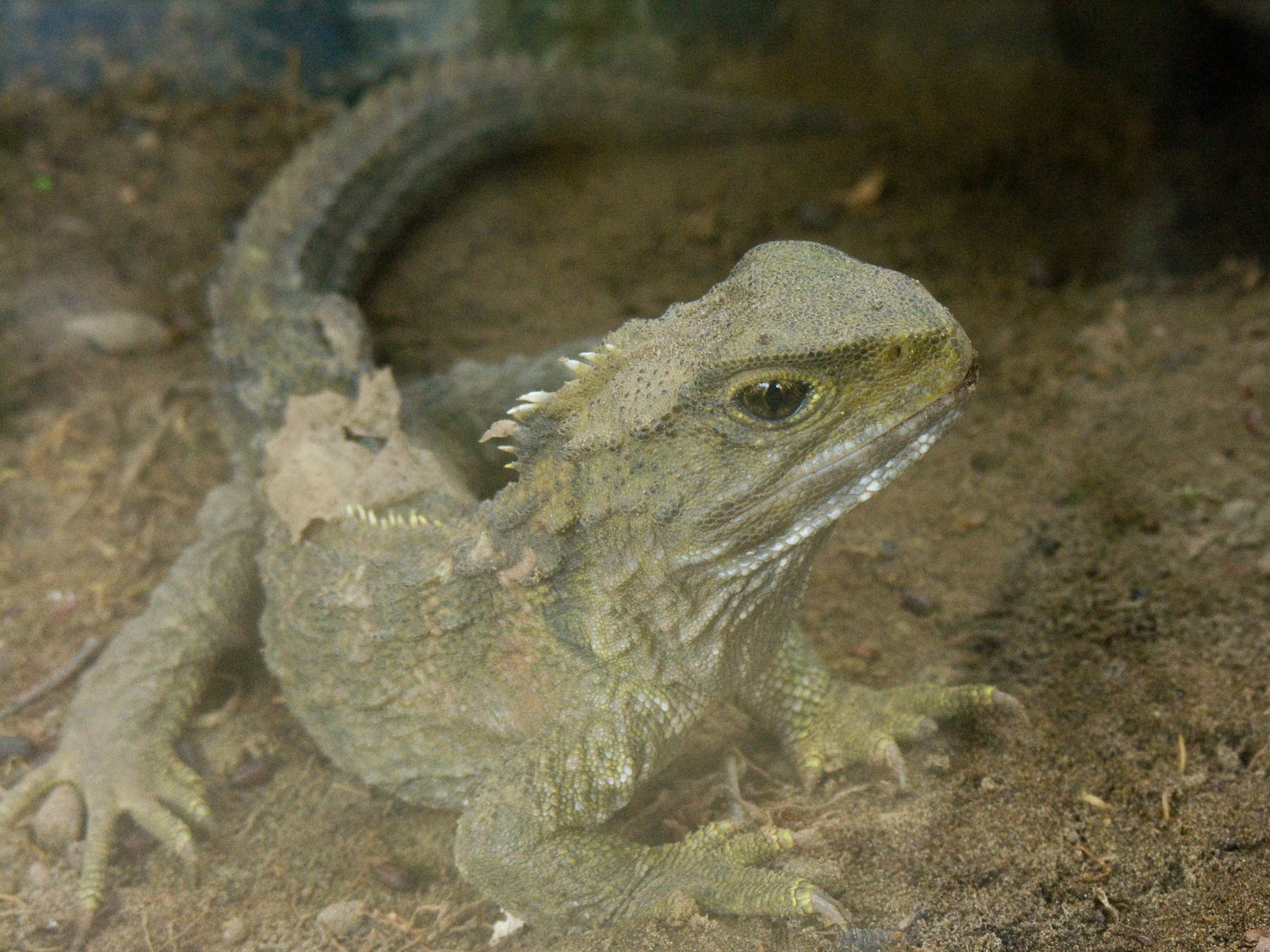
The two subspecies of tuatara are separated from all other species by over 200 million years

Phylogenetic diversity is a measure of biodiversity which incorporates phylogenetic difference between species. It is defined and calculated as "the sum of the lengths of all those branches that are members of the corresponding minimum spanning path", in which 'branch' is a segment of a cladogram, and the minimum spanning path is the minimum distance between the two nodes.

This definition is distinct from earlier measures which attempted to incorporate phylogenetic diversity into conservation planning, such as the measure of 'taxic diversity' introduced by Vane-Wright, Humphries, and William.

The concept of phylogenetic diversity has been rapidly adopted in conservation planning, with programs such as the Zoological Society of London's EDGE of Existence programme focused on evolutionary distinct species. Similarly, the WWF's Global 200 also includes unusual evolutionary phenomena in their criteria for selecting target ecoregions.

Some studies have indicated that alpha diversity is a good proxy for phylogenetic diversity, so suggesting that term has little use, but a study in the Cape Floristic Region showed that while phylogenetic and species/genus diversity are very strongly correlated (R2 = 0.77 and 0.96, respectively), using phylogenetic diversity led to selection of different conservation priorities than using species richness. It also demonstrated that PD led to greater preservation of 'feature diversity' than species richness alone.
