= Global Species Database =

Digital catalog of organisms

A Global Species Database (GSD) is a digital catalog of organisms often defined around a conservation purpose for the organisms of interest. GSDs attempt to be globally inclusive of species within their inclusion parameters versus local species databases. GSDs have a defined purpose, SPECIESDAB is a GSD for economically valuable fish species, while FishBase focuses on fin fish regardless of their human potential for exploitation. Attempts have been made to create GSDs for extinct species such as trilobites. A GSD can be broad in taxonomic scope, such as AlgaeBase comprehensively including algae and seagrasses from the entire planet, or narrow such as International Legume Database & Information Service, a GSD for members of a single plant family, the Fabaceae.

A database restricted by geography such as Calflora focusing on California Floristic Province flowering plants and ferns is not a GSD.

The Catalogue of Life links together a number of GSDs of animals, plants, fungi, and microorganisms, such as FishBase and AlgaeBase, and integrates these at a high level through a single node facilitating ease of access to global species data.

== See also ==
- Global 200, a global list of ecoregions that are conservation priorities
- Global biodiversity, includes species diversity, as well as genetic and ecosystem diversity
