= Pin-point method (ecology) =

The pin-point method (or point-intercept method) is one of the most common methods used for non-destructive measurements of plant cover and plant biomass.

In a pin-point analysis, a frame (or a transect) with a fixed grid pattern is placed above the vegetation. The quadrant is placed A pin is inserted vertically through one of the grid points into the vegetation and will typically touch a number of plants. The number of times the pin touches different plant species is then recorded. This procedure is repeated at each grid point. Vertical rulers connected to the frame are used to prevent horizontal drift of the pins and to measure the height of vegetation hit by the pins.

== Limitations ==
Despite its widespread use, the pin-point method(point-intercept method) has several limitations. It is relatively ineffective for detecting rare species, which may be missed entirely. When rare species are detected, their abundance may be over estimated.

Accuracy is sensitive to sampling design. Non-random placement of quadrants or transects can bias estimates, particularly in patchy regions.

Additionally, a substantial amount of sampling is needed to achieve high precision, especially when a species cover is near intermediate values, and variability is large,

Finally, this method is not well suited for structurally complex environments such as forest canopies or layered vegetation.
