= AlgaeBase =

Species database

Content
- Description: A large and extensively accessed biological database about algae
- Data types captured: Comprehensive species data, including taxonomy, distribution, habitats and photos
- Organisms: Algae species

Contact
- Research center: National University of Ireland's Ryan Institute
- Release date: March 1996

Access
- Website: algaebase.org

AlgaeBase is a global species database of information on all groups of algae, both marine and freshwater, as well as sea-grass.

== History ==
AlgaeBase began in March 1996, founded by Michael Guiry.

By 2005, the database contained about 65,000 names.

In 2013, AlgaeBase and the Flanders Marine Institute (VLIZ) signed an end-user license agreement regarding the Electronic Intellectual Property of AlgaeBase. This allows the World Register of Marine Species (WoRMS) to include taxonomic names of algae in WoRMS, thereby allowing WoRMS, as part of the Aphia database, to make its overview of all described marine species more complete. Synchronisation of the AlgaeBase data with Aphia and WoRMS was undertaken manually until March 2015, but this was very time-consuming, so an online application was developed to semi-automate the synchronisation, launching in 2015 in conjunction with Michael Guiry and the chief programmer of AlgaeBase, Pier Kuipers. After a long phase of further development and testing, the AlgaeBase harvester tool was implemented by the WoRMS data management team in early 2019. Since then, newly-added species in AlgaeBase are added to Aphia and, if marine, to WoRMS as well.

== Description ==
The database is hosted at the National University of Ireland's Ryan Institute, in Galway. It includes about all types of algae, as well as one group of flowering plants, the sea-grasses. Information about each species' taxonomy, nomenclature and distribution is included, and the algae covered include terrestrial as well as marine and freshwater species, such as seaweeds, phytoplankton, and freshwater algae. As of 2019, marine species have the best coverage, including sea-grasses.

As of 2014 there were nearly 17,000 images, and the database was being used by 2,000–3,000 individual visitors each day.

As of 2023, there were about 170,000 species and infraspecies in AlgaeBase.

== Support and funding ==
The compilation of the data was funded by the Irish Government Department of Education and Science's Programme for Research in Third-level Institutions (PRTLI) 2, 3 and 4 programmes, to the Ryan Institute and the Environmental Change Institute, as well as by Atlantic Philanthropies, and the European Union.

The synchronisation between AlgaeBase and Aphia was possible through support of the LifeWatch Species Information Backbone. LifeWatch, the E-Science European Infrastructure for Biodiversity and Ecosystem Research, is a distributed virtual laboratory, which is used for different aspects of biodiversity research.

As of 2022, the main sponsors of the database are the Phycological Society of America, the British Phycological Society, the International Phycological Society, and the Korean Phycological Society. Programming is carried out by Pier Kuipers, Caoilte Guiry, and Michael Guiry. Jonathan Guthrie was responsible for programming much of earlier versions.
