= Biotic homogenization =

Biotic homogenization is the process by which two or more spatially distributed ecological communities become increasingly similar over time. This process may be genetic, taxonomic, or functional, and it leads to a loss of beta (β) diversity. While the term is sometimes used interchangeably with "taxonomic homogenization", "functional homogenization", and "genetic homogenization", biotic homogenization is actually an overarching concept that encompasses the other three. This phenomenon stems primarily from two sources: extinctions of native and invasions of nonnative species. While this process pre-dates human civilization, as evidenced by the fossil record, and still occurs due to natural impacts, it has recently been accelerated due anthropogenic pressures. Biotic homogenization has become recognized as a significant component of the biodiversity crisis, and as such has become of increasing importance to conservation ecologists.

== Overview ==
=== Homogenization versus differentiation ===
Homogenization is the process of assemblages becoming increasingly similar: the reverse is the process of assemblages becoming increasingly different over time, a process known as "biotic differentiation". Just as biotic homogenization has genetic, taxonomic, and functional components, differentiation can occur at any of these levels of organization.

=== Alpha and beta diversity ===
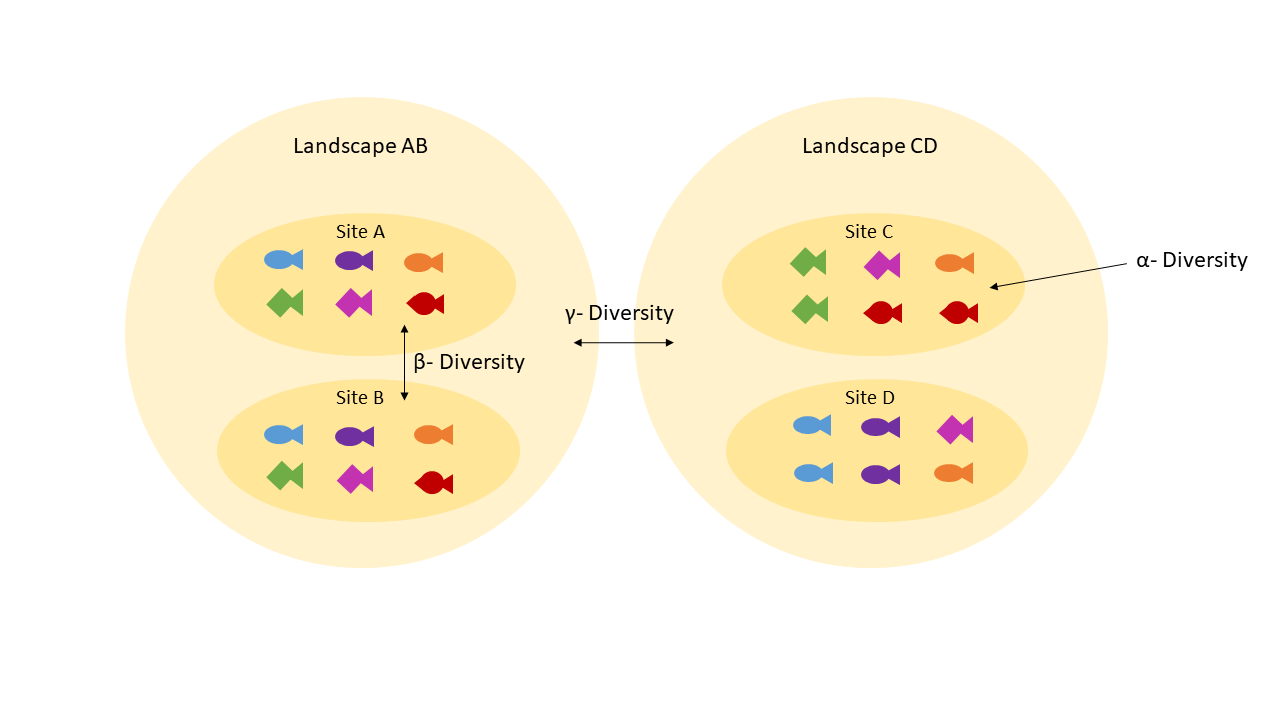
Alpha diversity describes diversity within a population; beta diversity describes diversity between populations.

Understanding homogenization requires an understanding of the difference between alpha (α) and beta (β) diversity. Alpha diversity refers to diversity within a community: it addresses how many species are present. A community with high α diversity has many species present. Beta diversity compares multiple communities. For there to be high β diversity, two communities would have to have high α diversity but have different, unique species compositions.

=== Species introduction, extinction, and richness ===
When organisms are introduced to a new area and establish self-sustaining populations, be it through natural processes (e.g., dispersal) or human-aided processes (e.g., accidental or purposeful release via an introduction pathway), overall species richness increases (assuming no other species are simultaneously lost). Similarly, when species are lost from a community due to local extinction (called extirpation), species richness decreases. While an increase or decrease in species richness indicates an increase or decrease in α diversity, respectively, homogenization or differentiation may result depending on the identity of the species being gained or lost from the community.

==== Positive relationships with richness ====
While it may seem counterintuitive, there are times when increased species richness (α diversity) also leads to increased homogenization. If we imagine an example of two communities: community one contains four species (A, B, C, and D). Community two contains three species (C, D, and E). While there is overlap between these two communities, they are certainly different. However, if community two undergoes drastic change where E becomes extinct while A and B are simultaneously introduced, it now demonstrates higher species richness (greater α diversity), because there are now four species present instead of three. Yet, at the same time, communities one and two have become identical, removing any β diversity: they have homogenized. This particular trend is frequently observed in studies of biotic homogenization.

Sometimes decreased species richness can lead to greater β diversity and differentiation. If, in the example above, community one had lost species D and community two had lost species C, both communities would have lower α diversity because each would have one less species. However, the two communities would have no species in common, which would dramatically increase the β diversity, leading to differentiation.

==== Negative relationships with richness ====
In some cases, increased α diversity could theoretically lead to increased β diversity and differentiation. When we return to the previous example, community one still contains four species (A, B, C, and D) and community two contains three (C, D, and E). This time, C goes extinct in community two, but F and G are introduced at the same time. Community two now has greater richness and therefore greater α diversity. It also only now has one species in common with community one instead of two species. The two communities are now more different from each other than they were initially, indicating greater β diversity and therefore biotic differentiation.

Decreased richness could also lead to homogenization. If A were to go extinct in community one and E were to go extinct in community two, then both communities would have lower richness, since they both would be out one species. There would also be greater overlap in species composition between the two communities, indicating lost β diversity and increased homogenization.

=== Pressures leading to homogenization ===
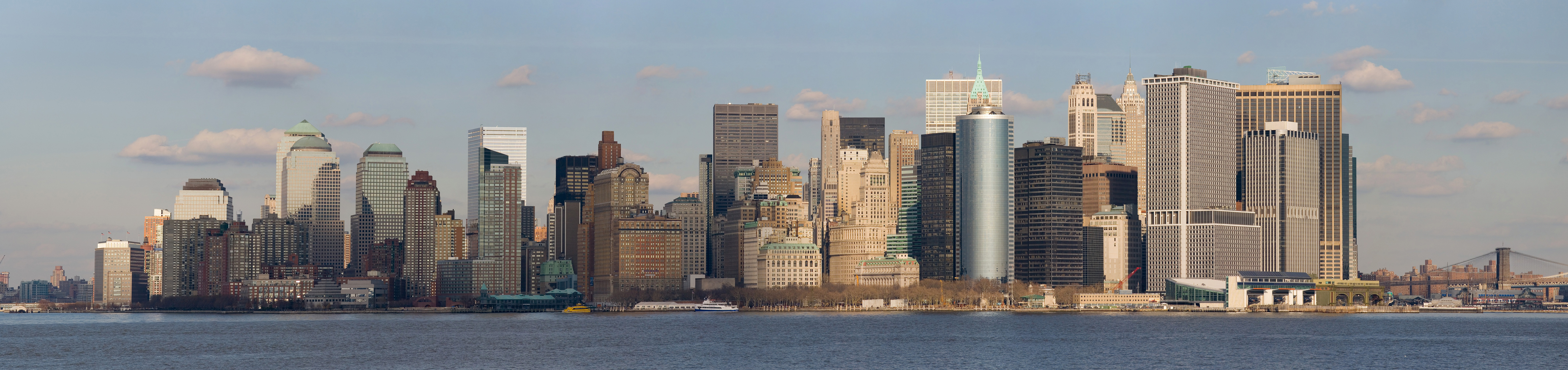
Urbanization changes species conformation in a habitat, and it can be a driving force in homogenization.

Homogenization can result from either anthropomorphic or natural pressures. Many cases of species introductions are the result of either unintentional or intentional introduction of species by humans, be it for the pet trade, recreation, or agriculture. Urbanization can also have profound impacts on biota, leading to changes in assemblages. Natural selection and other evolutionary forces that lead to extinction can also potentially lead to homogenization. Sometimes, previously isolated populations can become exposed to each other naturally. Species interactions can also cause local extinctions, be the relationship predatory or pathogenic.

== Components ==
=== Genetic ===
Genetic homogenization refers to the underlying molecular processes involved in biotic homogenization. It typically results from hybridization with non-native species, leading to decreased variation in the gene pool. These hybridization events may be either interspecific or intraspecific. Genetic homogenization can be analyzed in terms of allelic frequencies, which is accomplished through a comparison of how common specific genotypes are. If an allele occurs at a similar frequency between two populations, then there is greater homogenization present. Other evolutionary forces such as founder effects and bottleneck effects can also lead to genetic homogenization.

=== Taxonomic ===
Taxonomic homogenization is perhaps the most well-known and broadly studied component of biotic homogenization, and the two terms are often used interchangeably. It is most strictly defined as a loss in β diversity, meaning that multiple communities are increasing in taxonomic similarity over time. A common misconception with taxonomic homogenization is that it represents a loss in α diversity, or that it leads to decreased species richness. However, assemblages under taxonomic homogenization may actually display an increase in α diversity, a phenomenon that has been observed in plant, animal, and microbial groups.

=== Functional ===
Functional homogenization refers to the increase in similarity of function across a community: that is, similarity in the roles filled by the species. In an ecosystem that has undergone functional homogenization, there are increased species that fill the same functional role or niche, with fewer species occupying unique niches.

=== Behavioural ===
Behavioural homogenization refers to an increase in similarity in behaviour among individuals, populations, or species, and can be understood as a decline in behavioural β diversity across space or time. Repeated shifts in behavioural driven by urban environment may reduce behavioural variation within and among populations and species, potentially affecting ecosystem functioning, animal cultures, and human–wildlife interactions.

== Analysis ==
Measuring biotic homogenization ultimately requires measuring β diversity over time. Taxonomic homogenization is typically studied by comparing two species pools that may be separated spatially, temporally, or both. Researchers can choose to use extant pools only or pools containing both extant species and reconstructed historical species. It is not unusual to compare relationships between α diversity and β diversity in a population.

== Examples ==
Most studies of biotic homogenization have typically focused on fishes and vascular plants. More recently, however, homogenization has been demonstrated in other taxonomic groups.

=== Fossil Record ===
The fossil record gives multiple prehistoric examples of biotic homogenization. For example, the Panamanian land bridge between North and South America allowed previously isolated assemblages to homogenize. However, prehistoric rates of homogenization were at a far slower rate than they are currently. Additionally, organisms have been able to move far greater distances due to human actions than they ever have done naturally.

=== Animals ===
==== Birds ====
Both taxonomic and functional homogenization have been investigated in birds. Certain island studies have demonstrated that on a small spatial scale, that avian taxonomic homogenization occurs far more rapidly than it does on a larger spatial scale. In France, communities have been recorded as becoming increasingly functionally similar over the course of two decades. Interestingly, in other French studies, it has been noted that there is not a temporal relationship between functional and taxonomic homogenization, a trend that had been observed in freshwater fishes. In urban landscapes, the introduction of non-native species such as rock doves and European starlings has led to increased homogenization of urban avian communities. Many species considered "urban exploiters" also contribute to biotic homogenization in urban environments, in part due to their ability to utilize anthropogenic resources. There have been predictions that avian taxonomic homogenization is occurring on the global scale, which could lead to future mass extinctions of avifauna.

==== Mammals ====
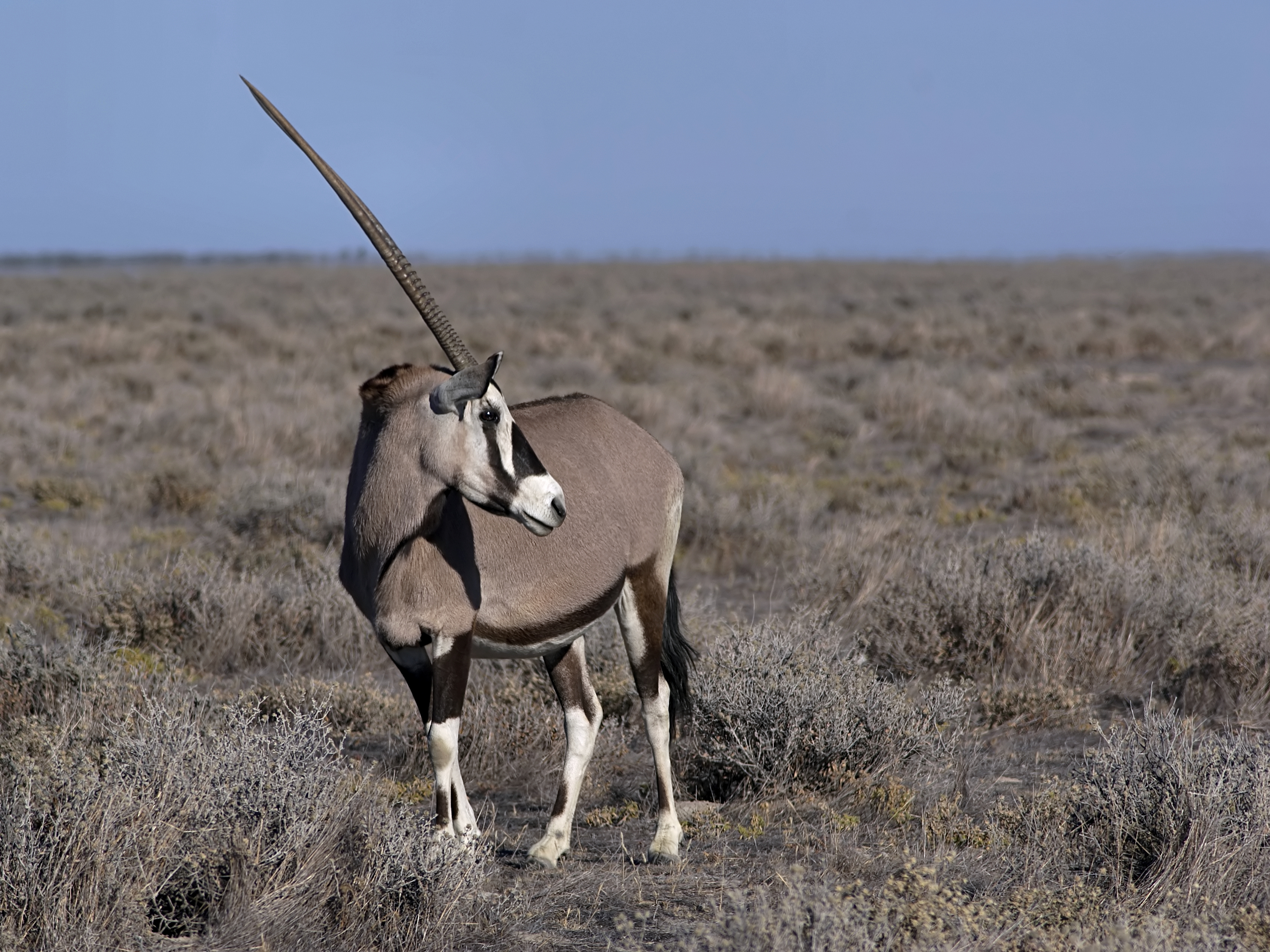
The Gemsbok is an ungulate in South Africa. Ungulates have been homogenizing at a greater rate in South Africa than they have been globally.

Ungulates were studied at both a global and local scale over a span of forty years, ending in 2005. On a global scale, it was found that homogenization had increased by 2%, and that introductions contributed more to this change than did extinctions. In a more localized study in South Africa, homogenization increased by 8%. In this example, species richness increased as homogenization increased.

==== Fishes ====
Freshwater fishes were among the first taxonomic groups to be used in homogenization studies, and trends have been observed on several continents. Homogenization in freshwater fishes typically stems from stocking of nonnative fishes for recreational purposes. In a more specific example, there was a 2015 study in Chile, where freshwater systems support diverse assemblages of endemic fishes. In a comparison of 201 watersheds that analyzed changes in similarities over 200 years, approximately 65% of comparisons demonstrate that the watersheds are undergoing homogenization.

==== Insects ====
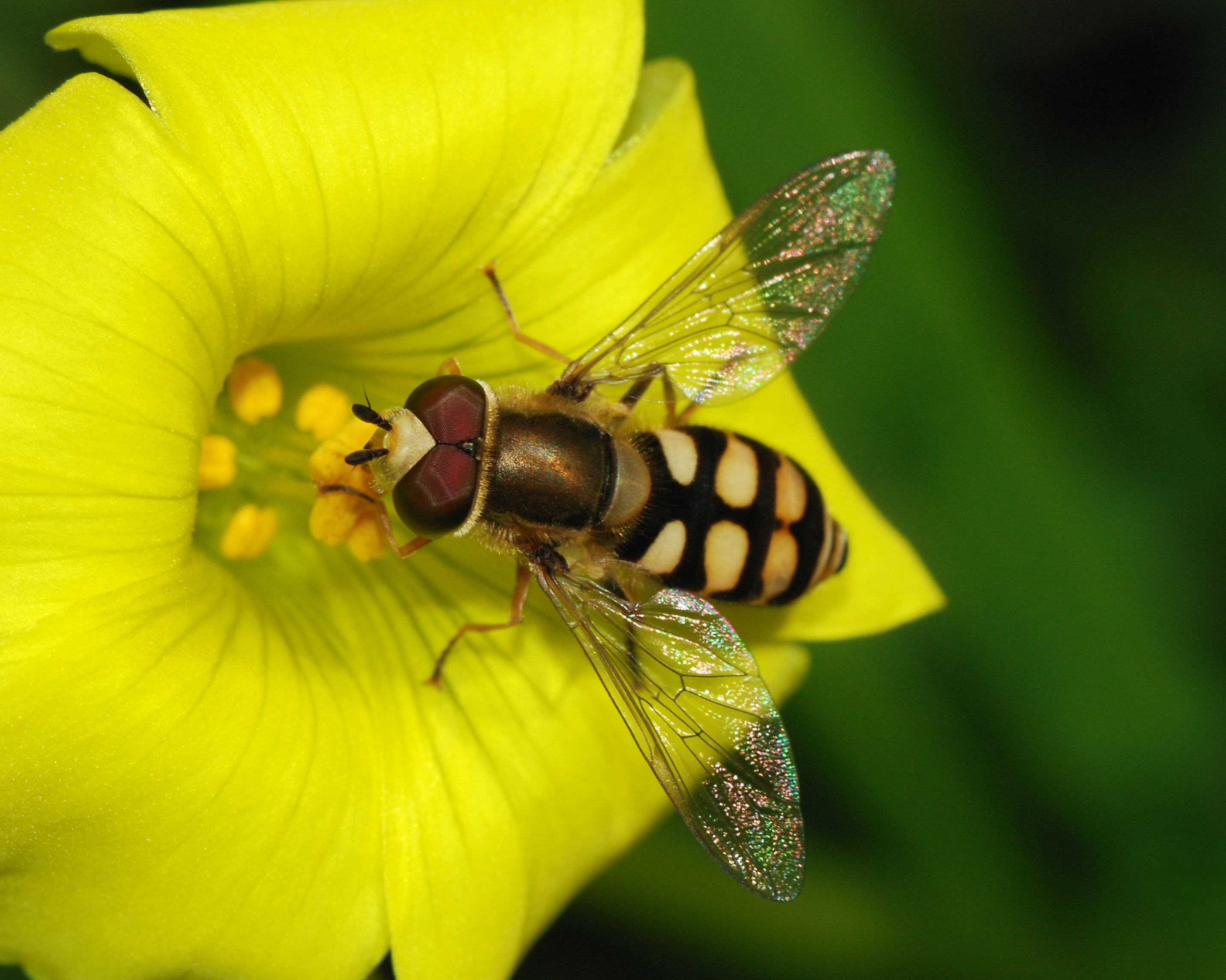
Hoverflies have become taxonomically homogenized in Europe.

While there have been fewer studies of biotic homogenization in insects compared to other taxonomic groups, there is evidence that it exists in multiple taxa. According to a 2015 study that examined bees, hoverflies, and butterflies, the extent to which taxonomic homogenization occurs varies with taxa, country, and spatial scale. In the three European countries that were included in the study, hoverflies had homogenized in all of the countries while bees and butterflies only homogenized in two countries. The scale at which homogenization occurred also varied between taxonomic groups.

==== Amphibians and reptiles ====
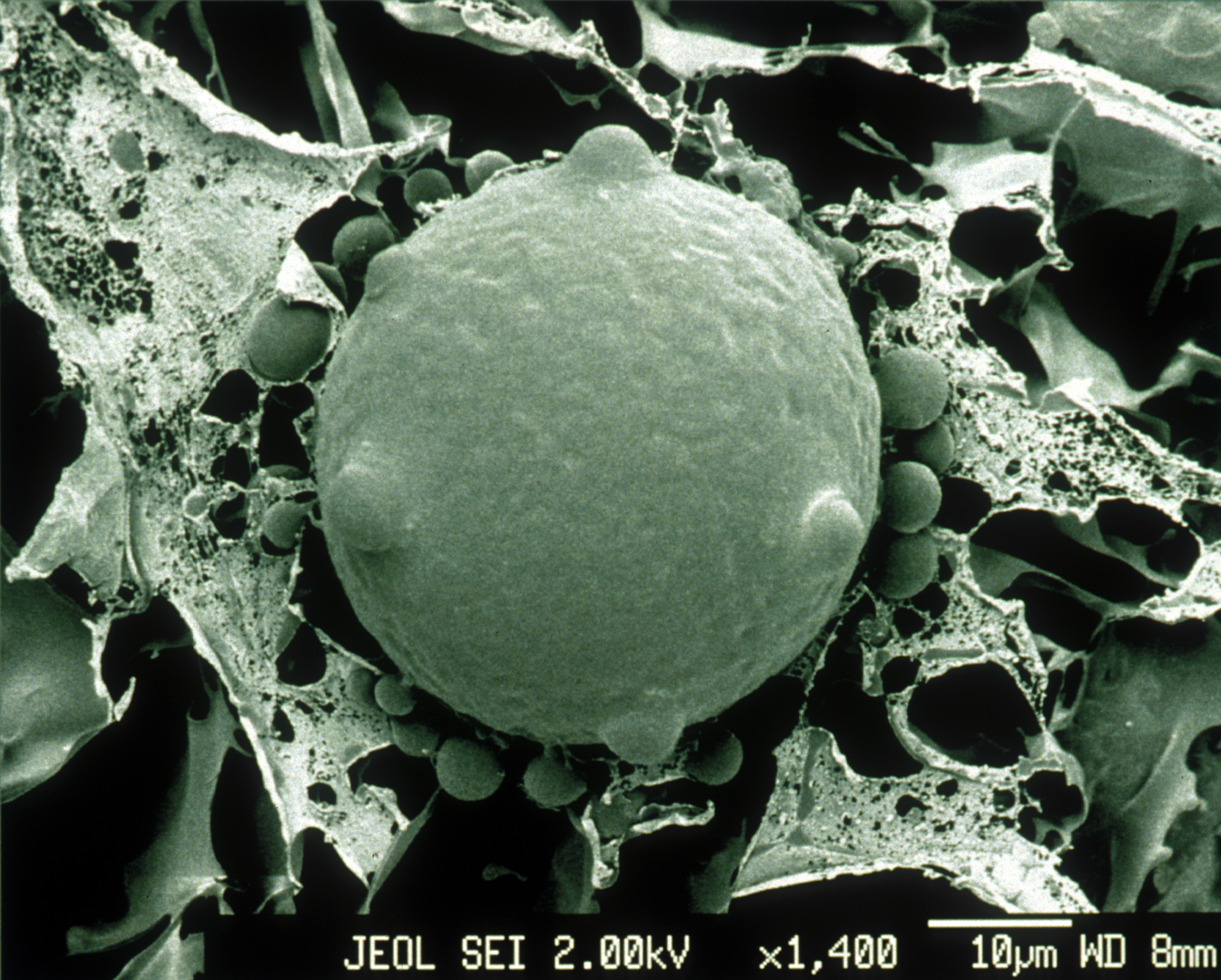
The chytrid fungus (Batrachochytrium dendrobatidis) is parasitic to amphibians, and has led to homogenization of amphibians in Central America.

There has been relatively little research on homogenization in the herpetofauna, and according to a 2006 study, introduction of nonnative reptiles has not led to homogenization of reptilian communities in Florida. However, in Central America, Batrachochytrium dendrobatidis, which is pathogenic to amphibians, has led to selective extinction of certain taxa, which in turn has resulted in homogenization of certain amphibian assemblages. In addition to this more natural example of homogenization, there is evidence that there is amphibian homogenization of human-impacted environments around the world.

=== Plants ===
Anthropomorphic impacts on plants have been complex, with overall species richness of flora increasing over the course of human history. Additionally, there have been significantly more introductions on the continental scale than there have been extinction of endemics, increasing overall species richness and α diversity. However, β diversity has decreased in some circumstances, resulting in homogenization effects.

=== Microorganisms ===
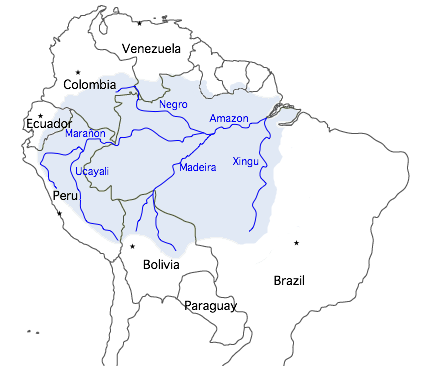
Agriculture in the Amazon River Basin (pictured above) has led to homogenization of bacteria.

Agriculture in the Amazon river basin has been connected to an increase in α diversity but a decrease in β diversity of bacteria. This trend is likely due to the loss of endemic species that have limited ranges being replaced by tolerant, generalist species.

== Implications ==
=== Ecology and Evolution ===
Community composition, rather than richness, plays the more crucial role in maintaining the ecosystem. Due to the fact that the study of biotic homogenization is still relatively new, the implications of homogenization on the environment are still not entirely clear and it is possible that its impacts may not be all negative. Further research is required to determine the extent of its impact on the ecosystem. However, as ecosystems become increasingly similar and simplified, there is concern that the resilience of the assemblages against stressful events will be limited. Indeed, the more limited an assemblage becomes on functional, taxonomic, and genetic levels, the more constrained that assemblage is in its ability to evolve. Natural selection acts on diversity between individuals and species, and if that diversity does not exist, communities are severely limited in their future evolutionary paths.

=== Conservation ===
Limiting biotic homogenization ultimately relies on limiting its sources: species invasion and extinction. Because these are largely driven by human activity, if conservation is to be successful, it is necessary to reduce the degree to which people cause invasions and extinctions. Since biotic homogenization is still a relatively new area of study, increased education about both its mechanism and impact could potentially be effective as well. If we are to improve our understanding of the field, it is necessary to increase the scale of our knowledge of its spatial, temporal, geographic, and taxonomic components. There is a disproportionate number of studies in taxonomic homogenization, with relatively few in functional homogenization, which could have greater ecological implications. Increased study into functional homogenization could give insight into conservation needs. These gaps in the literature may, however, soon be filled. The study of homogenization is increasingly gaining attention in ecological circles, with the number of studies quantifying its effects increasing exponentially between the years of 2000 and 2015.
