= Frances Lawrence Parker =

American geologist (1906 – 2002)

Frances Lawrence Parker (28 March 1906 – 2002) was an American geologist and micropaleontologist focusing on paleoceanography and micropaleontology. She is known for her research on benthic and planktonic foraminifera.

== Life and education ==
Frances Lawrence Parker was born on March 28, 1906, in Brookline, Massachusetts. She was the fourth child of Philip Stanley Parker and Eleanor Payson Parker.

Parker attended Vassar College. She graduated in 1928 with a bachelor's degree in geology and a minor in chemistry. Vassar College was one of few institutions that offered science courses for women at the time. Parker participated in geological field studies in Wyoming, focusing on glacial geology, accompanied by geologist Thomas McDougall Hills.

In 1930, Parker graduated from the Massachusetts Institute of Technology with a master's degree in geology.

== Career ==
After completing her master's degree, Parker became a research assistant for micropaleontologist Joseph Cushman at the Cushman Laboratory in Sharon, Massachusetts in 1930. Cushman and Parker studied foraminifera, with funding from the U.S. Geological Survey. While studying foraminifera, Parker passed the U.S. Geological Survey exam and became an assistant paleontologist.

In the 1930s, Cushman and Parker traveled to central Europe to study specimens and visit scientists, museums, and laboratories engaged in micropaleontology. The pair published 16 papers with research gathered between 1930 and 1940. During the summers of 1936 to 1940, Parker also conducted research for the Woods Hole Oceanographic Institution alongside Fred B. Phleger.

In 1940, Parker briefly stepped back from her scientific work and took a job as an academic secretary at Foxcroft School, an exclusive girls’ school in Virginia.

In 1943, she returned to a research position with the Shell Oil Company in Houston, expanding her foraminifera taxonomy work into the petroleum industry. She held a senior paleontologist position with the company from 1943 to 1945 when she became ill with tuberculosis.

Once she had recovered, Parker returned to working with Fred B. Phleger, then faculty at Amherst College, in 1947. She conducted summer research in his laboratory, which was funded by the Woods Hole Oceanographic Institution. Together, they studied the taxonomy of Atlantic foraminifera.

Parker and Phleger continued to work together during the 1950s, moving their research to La Jolla, California. After founding the Marina Foraminifera Laboratory at Scripps Institution of Oceanography, Parker worked first as an associate in marine geology, then as a junior research geologist, and, finally, as an assistant research geologist.

After a brief break from Scripps Institution of Oceanography, Parker returned and was promoted to associate research geologist in 1960. She worked as a research paleontologist from 1967 until her retirement in 1973. Although retired, Parker continued to work as a research associate for another decade. While at the Scripps Institution of Oceanography, Parker wrote and published over 30 articles, both independently and in collaboration with colleagues.

== Works and contributions ==
Parker explored and published papers on many topics, including taxonomy, ecology, biogeography, stratigraphy, and preservation. Her most cited paper is "Planktonic foraminiferal species in Pacific sediments,” published in 1962. This paper changed the classification of planktonic foraminifers at the genus level and higher. A 1973 follow-up study, titled “Late Cenozoic biostratigraphy (planktonic foraminifera) of tropical Atlantic deep-sea sections," has also been widely cited. She served as an editor for special publications at the Cushman Foundation for Foraminiferal Research (1956–1963).

In 1950, Parker founded the Marine Foraminifera Laboratory at Scripps Institution of Oceanography with Fred B. Phleger. The laboratory was funded first by the American Petroleum Institute, and later by the Office of Naval Research and National Science Foundation.

The Deep Sea Drilling Project, funded by NSF and housed at the Scripps Institute utilized Parker's research on foraminifera stratigraphy in examining cores of ocean bottom sediments (1966–1986).

The Berger-Parker index is named after Parker and Wolfgang H. Berger.

== Awards and honors ==
Parker has been recognized as an influential researcher, earning the Cushman Award for Outstanding Achievement in Foraminiferal Research in 1981.

The Parker Bank, located on the Louisiana Shelf in the Gulf of Mexico was named in Parker's honor in 1976 by the US Geological Society.

The foraminifera Neoconorbina parkerae is named to honor Parker.

== Published books ==
- Ecology of Foraminifera from San Antonio Bay and Environs, Southwest Texas
- The Clinch River Study: An Investigation of the Fate of Radionuclides
