= Relative abundance distribution =

Metric in ecology

In ecology the relative abundance distribution (RAD) or species abundance distribution (SAD) describes the relationship between the number of species observed in a field study as a function of their observed abundance. The SAD is one of ecology's oldest and most universal laws – every community shows a hollow curve or hyperbolic shape on a histogram with many rare species and just a few common species. When plotted as a histogram of number (or percent) of species on the y-axis vs. abundance on an arithmetic x-axis, the classic hyperbolic J-curve or hollow curve is produced, indicating a few very abundant species and many rare species. The SAD is central prediction of the Unified neutral theory of biodiversity.

Starting in the 1970s and running unabated to the present day, mechanistic models (models attempting to explain the causes of the hollow curve SAD) and alternative interpretations and extensions of prior theories have proliferated to an extraordinary degree. The graphs obtained in this manner are typically fitted to a Zipf–Mandelbrot law, the exponent of which serves as an index of biodiversity in the ecosystem under study.
