= Dark taxon =

Taxon that does not appear to produce any observable morphological structure

A dark taxon (pl. dark taxa) is a term generally to denote taxa belonging to groups for which the number of estimated species greatly surpasses the number of species currently described. The concept was created in response to the advancement of molecular techniques such as DNA barcoding, which have allowed taxonomists to more accurately estimate the number of undescribed species in a taxonomic group.

Although the exact definition for the term can vary between the studies of different branches in the tree of life, depending on their main methods of study, dark taxa are generally difficult to identify and isolate from other similar or related taxa. The emergence of the dark taxon concept has highlighted the divergence between traditional morphological methods in taxonomy from newer molecular methods.

== Definitions ==
Due to differences in the methods used in identifying and describing new species across the tree of life, multiple definitions exist for what comprises a dark taxon. The term "dark taxon" was first coined by Roderic D. M. Page in a 2011 blog post showcasing the growing number of sequences in GenBank which lacked taxonomic names. Expanding on their definition in a 2016 paper, Page used the term dark taxon to refer specifically to barcodes generated from sequences on databases which have not been assigned to a known and formally described species. Since the introduction of the term, the definition of the "dark taxon" has expanded and diversified in accordance with the specific challenges in studying taxa across different branches in the tree of life.

In entomology and mycology, molecular methods such as large-scale DNA barcoding and eDNA metabarcoding have been used to estimate the number of undescribed species in a taxonomic group by calculating the proportion of operational taxonomic units (OTUs) for which there is an associated known described species out of the number of total OTUs obtained through large-scale insect sampling. Taxonomic groups where the number of "species" obtained through clustering sequences into OTUs greatly outnumbers the number of known described species are referred to as dark taxa. Hartop et al. 2022 define dark taxa as taxonomic groups where the number of estimated species exceeds 1000 while the number of currently described species is fewer than 10% of that estimate. This definition emphasizes the large diversity in a taxonomic group in contrast with the much smaller number of taxa in that group which have been described.

Nilsson et al. (2023) defines dark taxa (in the context of mycology) to be those which do not appear to produce any observable morphological structure and that appear impossible to cultivate in laboratory conditions.

Dark taxa should not be confused with dark diversity, an ecological concept referring to species absent from a local community despite suitable environmental conditions.

== Causes behind the existence of dark taxa ==
The concept of the dark taxon exists across all studies of the diversity in living organisms, but the factors which create dark taxa can vary between different taxonomic groups.

In insect taxonomy and systematics, the existence of dark taxa is often attributed to the taxonomic impediment. A combination of the lack of taxonomists, the lack of funding for taxonomy, and the slow pace of some more challenging taxonomic groups are responsible for the discrepancy between the number of described and estimated insect species.

While the taxonomic impediment is present in other taxonomic groups, other challenges can also slow down the rate of new species description, causing the discrepancy in estimated and known taxa leading to the designation of dark taxon status. In mycology, some fungal taxa are typically difficult to cultivate in laboratory conditions or have few distinguishing morphological features. Under the guidelines for species nomenclature, the International Code of Nomenclature for algae, fungi, and plants (ICN) requires the designation of a type specimen when describing a new species of fungus, often in the form of a cultured specimen. This significantly slows down the process of new species description, exacerbating the prevalence of dark taxa in mycology.

== Considerations for taxonomy and nomenclature ==
The approaches taken to describe dark taxa vary between disciplines. Some taxonomists have suggested forgoing the use of traditional morphological methods in favour of molecular methods to address the dark taxon problem. Under these proposed systems, new species descriptions could be made entirely through analysis of DNA sequences. However, the level of acceptance of this new system varies across disciplines and has been discouraged by many taxonomists in favour of a more integrated system using both molecular and morphological descriptive methods.

== See also ==
- Dark diversity
