= Species pool =

The ecological and biogeographical concept of the species pool describes all species available that could potentially colonize and inhabit a focal habitat area. The concept lays emphasis on the fact that "local communities aren't closed systems, and that the species occupying any local site typically came from somewhere else", however, the species pool concept may suffer from the logical fallacy of composition. Most local communities, however, have just a fraction of its species pool present. It is derived from MacArthur and Wilson's Island Biogeography Theory that examines the factors that affect the species richness of isolated natural communities. It helps to understand the composition and richness of local communities and how they are influenced by biogeographic and evolutionary processes acting at large spatial and temporal scales. The absent portion of species pool—dark diversity—has been used to understand processes influencing local communities. Methods to estimate potential but absent species are developing.

It has been hypothesized that there might be a direct correlation between species richness and the size of the species pool for plant communities. Elsewhere, it was reported that "trade-offs and species pool structure (size and trait distribution) determines the shape of the plant productivity-diversity relationship.
