= Robert Whittaker (ecologist) =

American ecologist (1920–1980)

Robert Harding Whittaker
- Born: December 27, 1920; Wichita, Kansas, U.S.
- Died: October 20, 1980 (aged 59); Ithaca, New York, U.S.
- Education: University of Illinois
- Known for: gradient theory in ecology five-kingdom system
- Awards: Eminent Ecologist Award (1981)
- Scientific career
- Fields: Ecology
- Workplaces: Cornell University, Washington State University

Robert Harding Whittaker (December 27, 1920 – October 20, 1980) was an American plant ecologist, active from the 1950s to the 1970s. He was the first to propose the five kingdom taxonomic classification of the world's biota into the Animalia, Plantae, Fungi, Protista, and Monera in 1969. He also proposed the Whittaker Biome Classification, which categorized biome types upon two abiotic factors: temperature and precipitation. He proposed the concepts of Alpha diversity, Beta diversity, and Gamma diversity.

Whittaker was elected to the National Academy of Sciences in 1974, received the Ecological Society of America's Eminent Ecologist Award in 1981, and was otherwise widely recognized and honored. He collaborated with many other ecologists including George Woodwell (Dartmouth), W. A. Niering, F. H. Bormann (Yale), and G. E. Likens (Cornell), and was particularly active in cultivating international collaborations.

== Early life ==
Born in Wichita, Kansas, he obtained a B.A. at Washburn Municipal College (now Washburn University) in Topeka, Kansas, and, following military service, his Ph.D. in Biology at the University of Illinois in 1948.

== Career ==
Whittaker held teaching and research positions at Washington State College in Pullman, Washington from 1948 to 1951, and then moved Hanford Laboratories Aquatic Biology Unit near Richland, Washington. In 1954, he was hired as an instructor in the Department of Biology of Brooklyn College, the City University of New York. In the 1960s, he worked at the University of California, Irvine and moved to a faculty position at Cornell University. where he spent the rest of his career.

== Early Career Challenges and Disputes ==
Despite his ultimate prominence, Whittaker's early academic life faced immense systemic opposition. Following his radical critiques of Frederic Clements' widely accepted climax theory, he was dismissed from his very first teaching position at Washington State College. Furthermore, institutional pushback against his individualistic species concept caused him to struggle for six consecutive years to officially publish his doctoral dissertation monograph on the Great Smoky Mountains. He persisted through these challenges, and his work was eventually featured in Ecological Monographs in 1956.

== Whittaker Biome Classification ==
Whittaker developed a widely adopted global biome classification framework that categorized large-scale ecosystems based on two core abiotic factors: mean annual temperature and mean annual precipitation. By plotting these two metrics on a bivariate graph, he successfully mapped the boundaries of major vegetation types - ranging from tropical rainforests to desert and tundra biomes. This model streamlines how modern ecologists predict large-scale changes in vegetation structures resulting from climatic variations.

== Research and Legacy ==
During his doctoral field research in the Great Smoky Mountains, Whittaker introduced a radical shift away from traditional ecological field techniques. Instead of relying on subjective classification groupings of plant associations, he adopted a strict methodology of random vegetation sampling. This groundbreaking field research laid the groundwork for his development of "gradient analysis". This concept provided convincing evidence that plant communities vary continuously along seamless environmental spectra, such as elevation and moisture changes, rather than forming discrete, neatly compartmentalized units. This finding echoed and vindicated the earlier work of Henry Alan Gleason and paralleled the concurrent research of John T. Curtis in Wisconsin.

Beyond his revolutionary 1969 five-kingdom taxonomic classification system, Whittaker redefined how biodiversity is scaled and measured across different regional scales. He conceptualized and popularized the definitions of Alpha diversity (local ecosystem richness), Beta diversity (rate of species turnover over environmental gradients), and Gamma diversity (overall regional diversity). His landmark 1970 textbook, Communities and Ecosystems, compiled these structural ideas, quickly establishing itself as a foundational system-focused framework within academic ecology.

== Family ==
Whittaker married biochemist Clara Buehl (then a coworker at Hanford Laboratories) in 1952. They had three children. Clara was diagnosed with cancer in 1972, and she later died on December 31, 1976.

Whittaker married graduate student Linda Olsvig in 1979. He too was diagnosed with lung cancer and died on October 20, 1980.

== Works ==
- Robert H. Whittaker, Communities and Ecosystems, Macmillan, 1970. Second edition 1975.
- Robert H. Whittaker (Ed), Classification of Plant Communities, 1978 (Handbook of Vegetation Science), Kluwer Academic Publishers, ISBN 90-6193-566-0
