= Abundance (ecology) =

Relative representation of a species in an ecosystem

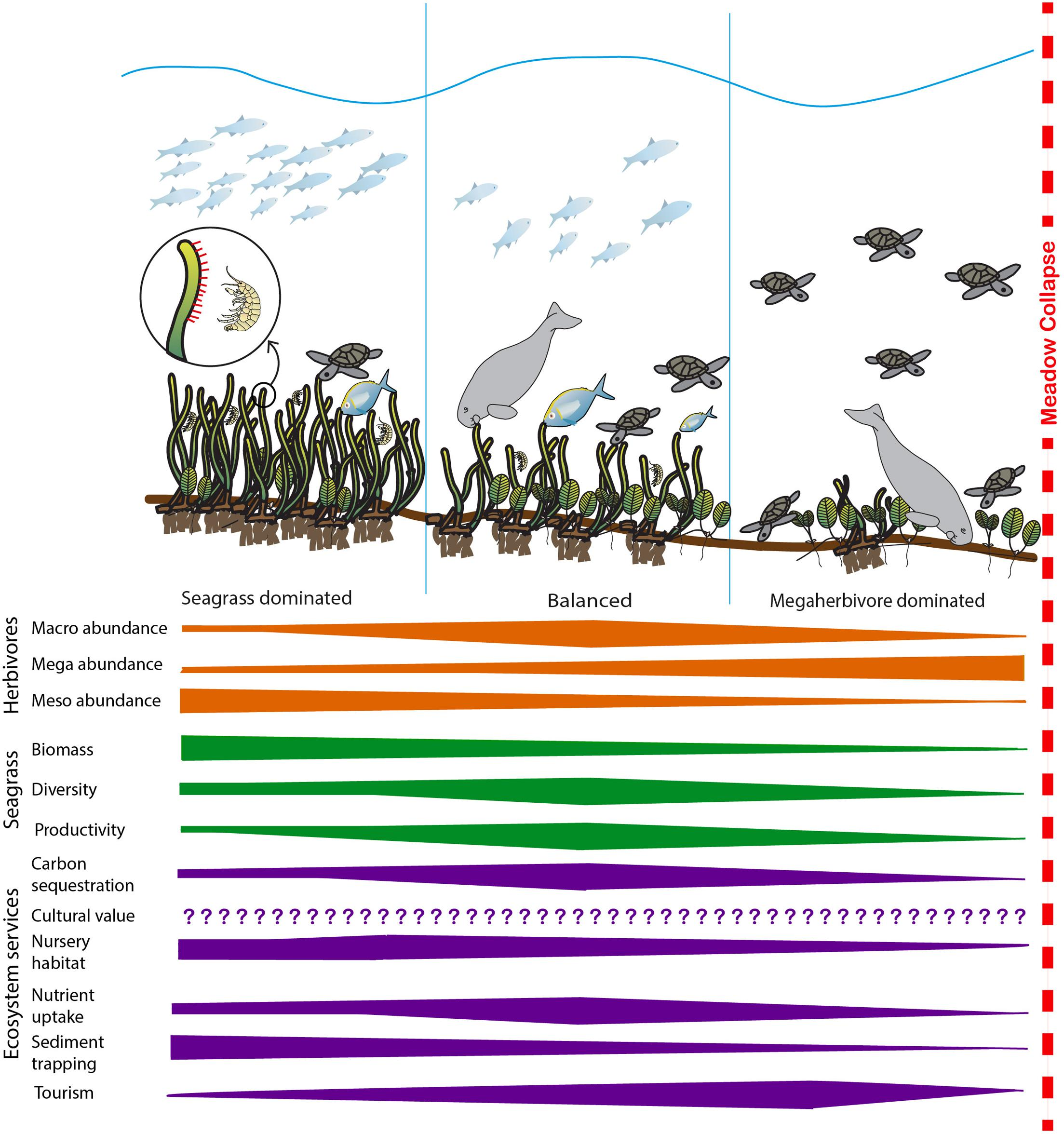
Effects of herbivore abundance in seagrass meadows.

In ecology, local abundance is the relative representation of a species in a particular ecosystem. It is usually measured as the number of individuals found per sample. The ratio of abundance of one species to one or multiple other species living in an ecosystem is referred to as relative species abundances. Both indicators are relevant for computing biodiversity.

A variety of sampling methods are used to measure abundance. For larger animals, these may include spotlight counts, track counts and roadkill counts, as well as presence at monitoring stations. In many plant communities the abundances of plant species are measured by plant cover, i.e. the relative area covered by different plant species in a small plot. Abundance is in simplest terms usually measured by identifying and counting every individual of every species in a given sector. It is common for the distribution of species to be skewed so that a few species take up the bulk of individuals collected.

Relative species abundance is calculated by dividing the number of species from one group by the total number of species from all groups.

== Community ecology ==
These measures are all a part of community ecology. Understanding patterns within a community is easy when the community has a relatively low number of species. However most communities do not have a low number of species. Measuring species abundance allows for understanding of how species are distributed within an ecosystem. For example, salt water marshes have an influx of sea water, causing only a few species which are adapted to be able to survive in both salt and fresh water to be abundant. Conversely in land locked wetlands, the species abundance is more evenly distributed among the species who live within the wetland.

In most ecosystems in which abundance has been calculated, most often only a small number of species are abundant, while a large number are pretty rare. These abundant species are often generalists, with many rare species being specialists. High density of a species in multiple localities will usually lead to it being relatively abundant over all in an ecosystem. Therefore, high local abundance can be directly linked to high regional distribution. Species with high abundance are likely to have more offspring, and these offspring in turn are more likely to colonize a new sector of the ecosystem than a species which is less abundant. Thus begins a positive feedback loop leading to a species distribution in which a few "core species" are wide spread, and the other species are restricted and scarce known as satellite species.

== Species abundance distribution ==
Species abundance distribution (SAD) is one of the main uses of this measurement. SAD is a measurement of how common, or rare species are within an ecosystem. This allows researchers to assess how different species are distributed throughout an ecosystem. SAD is one of the most basic measurements in ecology and is used very often, therefore many different methods of measurement and analysis have developed.

== Measurement ==
There are several methods for measuring abundance. An example of this is Semi-Quantitative Abundance ratings. These are measurement methods which involve estimation based on viewing a specific area of a designated size. The two Semi-Quantitive Abundance ratings used are known as the D.A.F.O.R, and the A.C.F.O.R.

The A.C.F.O.R. scale is as follows:

- A – Species observed is "Abundant" within the given area.
- C – Species observed is "Common" within the given area.
- F – Species observed is "Frequent" within the given area.
- O – Species observed is "Occasional" within the given area
- R – Species observed is "Rare" within the given area.

D.A.F.O.R scale:

- D - Species observed is "Dominant" in a given area.
- A - Species observed is "Abundant" in a given area.
- F - Species observed is "Frequent" in a given area.
- O - Species observed is "Occasional" in a given area.
- R - Species observed is "Rare" in a given area.

These methods are useful for getting a rough estimate of the species abundance in a designated area (quadrant), but they are not exact or objective measurements. Therefore, if another method of measuring abundance is available, it should be used, as this will lead to more useful and quantifiable data.

== See also ==
- Abundance estimation
- Cover-abundance
- Living Planet Index
- Occupancy–abundance relationship
- Plant cover
- Range (biology)
- Relative abundance distribution
- Species richness
