= Global biodiversity =

Total variability of Earth's life forms

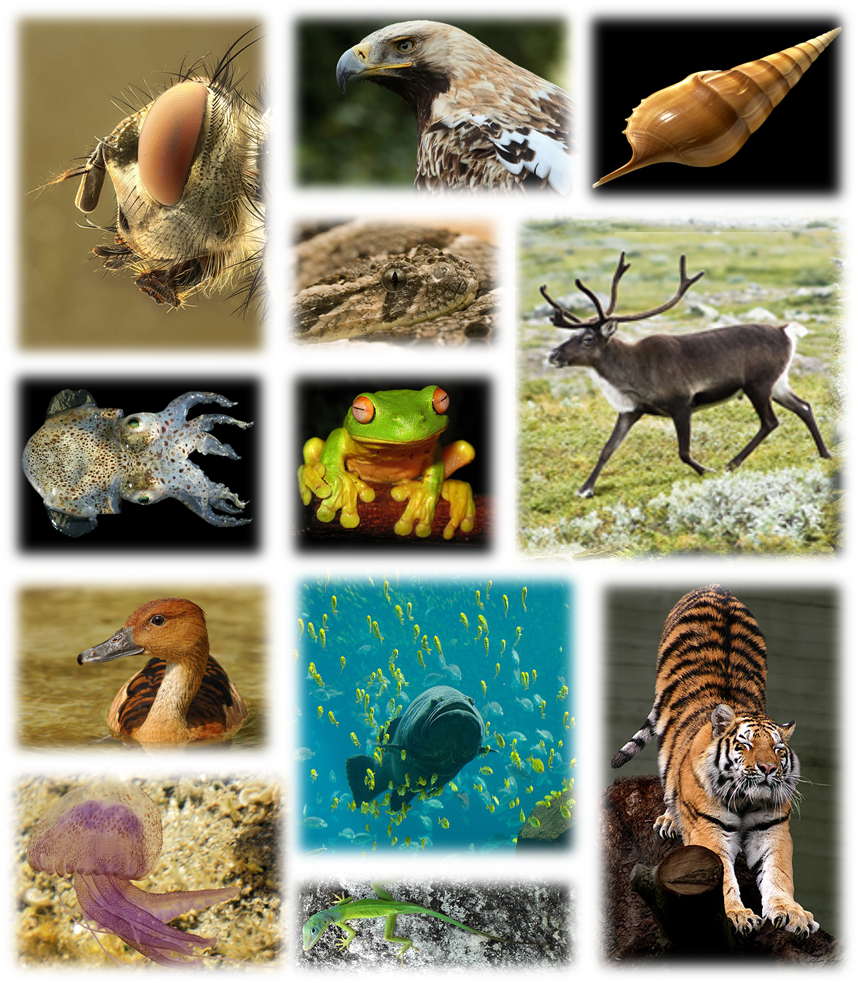
Examples of the multicellular biodiversity of the Earth.

Global biodiversity is the measure of biodiversity on Earth and is defined as the total variability of life forms. More than 99 percent of all species that ever lived on Earth are estimated to be extinct. Estimates on the number of Earth's current species range from 2 million to 1 trillion, but most estimates are around 11 million species or fewer. About 1.74 million species were databased as of 2018, and over 80 percent have not yet been described. The total amount of DNA base pairs on Earth, as a possible approximation of global biodiversity, is estimated at 5.0 × 10^{37}, and weighs 50 billion tonnes. In comparison, the total mass of the biosphere has been estimated to be as much as 4 TtC (trillion tons of carbon).

In other related studies, around 1.9 million extant species are believed to have been described currently, but some scientists believe 20% are synonyms, reducing the total valid described species to 1.5 million. In 2013, a study published in Science estimated there to be 5 ± 3 million extant species on Earth although that is disputed. Another study, published in 2011 by PLoS Biology, estimated there to be 8.7 million ± 1.3 million eukaryotic species on Earth. Some 250,000 valid fossil species have been described, but this is believed to be a small proportion of all species that have ever lived.

Global biodiversity is affected by extinction and speciation. The background extinction rate varies among taxa but it is estimated that there is approximately one extinction per million species years. Mammal species, for example, typically persist for 1 million years. Biodiversity has grown and shrunk in earth's past due to (presumably) abiotic factors such as extinction events caused by geologically rapid changes in climate. Climate change 299 million years ago was one such event. A cooling and drying resulted in catastrophic rainforest collapse and subsequently a great loss of diversity, especially of amphibians.

== Known species ==
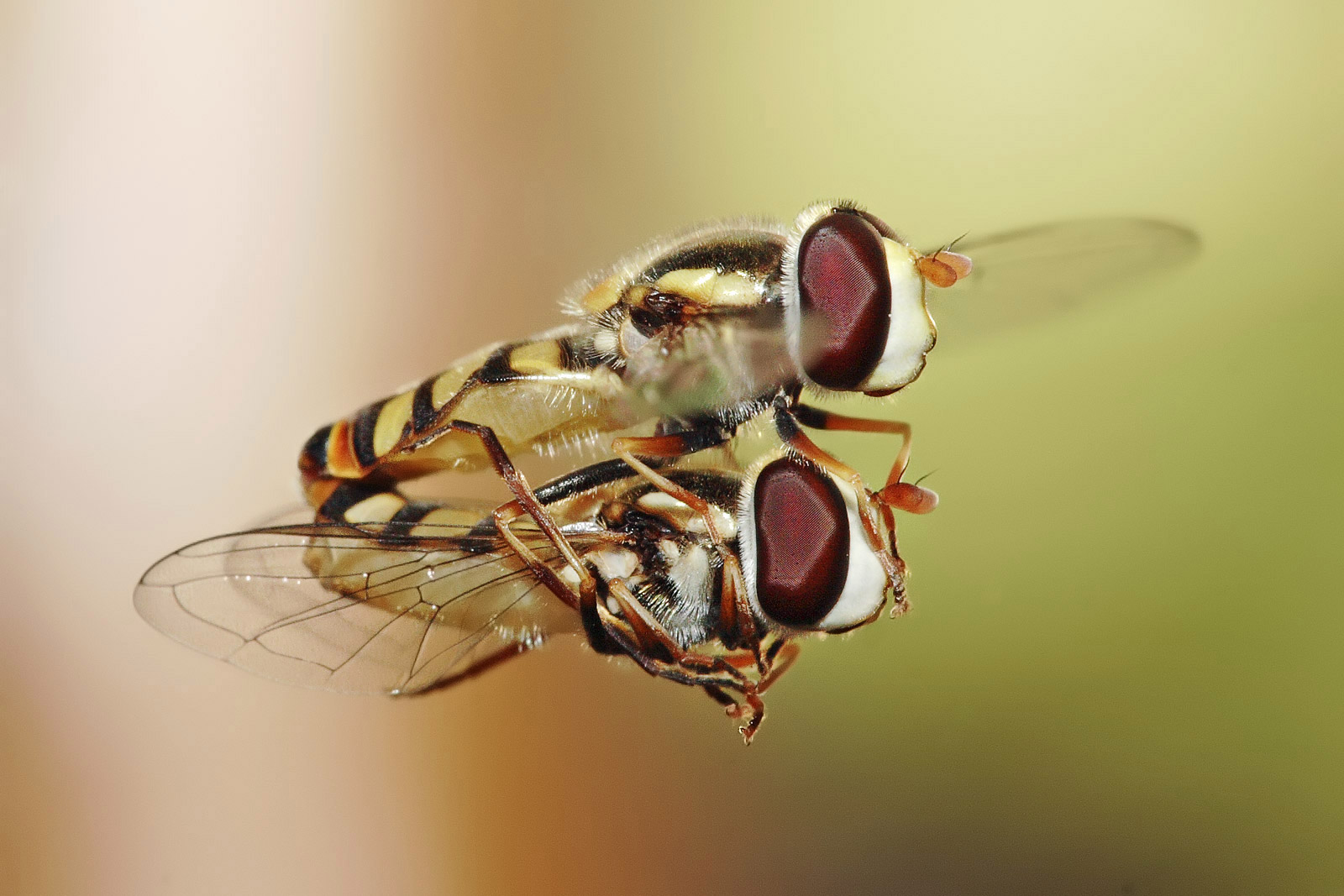
Insects make up the vast majority of animal species.

Chapman, 2005 and 2009 has attempted to compile perhaps the most comprehensive recent statistics on numbers of extant species, drawing on a range of published and unpublished sources, and has come up with a figure of approximately 1.9 million estimated described taxa, as against possibly a total of between 11 and 12 million anticipated species overall (described plus undescribed), though other reported values for the latter vary widely. In many cases, the values given for "Described" species are an estimate only (sometimes a mean of reported figures in the literature) since for many of the larger groups in particular, comprehensive lists of valid species names do not currently exist. For fossil species, exact or even approximate numbers are harder to find; Raup, 1986 includes data based on a compilation of 250,000 fossil species so the true number is undoubtedly somewhat higher than this. The number of described species is increasing by around 18,000–19,000 extant, and approaching 2,000 fossil species each year, as of 2012. The number of published species names is higher than the number of described species, sometimes considerably so, on account of the publication, through time, of multiple names (synonyms) for the same accepted taxon in many cases.

Based on Chapman's (2009) report, the estimated numbers of described extant species as of 2009 can be broken down as follows:

Major/Component group			Described	Global estimate (described + undescribed)
Chordates			64,788	~80,500
↳	Mammals		5,487	~5,500
↳	Birds		9,990	>10,000
↳	Reptiles		8,734	~10,000
↳	Amphibia		6,515	~15,000
↳	Fishes		31,153	~40,000
↳	Agnatha		116	unknown
↳	Cephalochordata		33	unknown
↳	Tunicata		2,760	unknown
Invertebrates			~1,359,365	~6,755,830
↳	Hemichordata		108	~110
↳	Echinodermata		7,003	~14,000
↳	Insecta		~1,000,000 (965,431–1,015,897)	~5,000,000
	↳	Archaeognatha	470	
	↳	Blattodea	3,684–4,000	
	↳	Coleoptera	360,000–~400,000	1,100,000
	↳	Dermaptera	1,816	
	↳	Diptera	152,956	240,000
	↳	Embioptera	200–300	2,000
	↳	Ephemeroptera	2,500–<3,000	
	↳	Hemiptera	80,000–88,000	
	↳	Hymenoptera	115,000	>~1,000,000
	↳	Isoptera	2,600–2,800	4,000
	↳	Lepidoptera	174,250	300,000–500,000
	↳	Mantodea	2,200	
	↳	Mecoptera	481	
	↳	Megaloptera	250–300	
	↳	Neuroptera	~5,000	
	↳	Notoptera	55	
	↳	Odonata	6,500	
	↳	Orthoptera	24,380	
	↳	Phasmatodea (Phasmida)	2,500–3,300	
	↳	Phthiraptera	>3,000–~3,200	
	↳	Plecoptera	2,274	
	↳	Psocoptera	3,200–~3,500	
	↳	Siphonaptera	2,525	
	↳	Strepsiptera	596	
	↳	Thysanoptera	~6,000	
	↳	Trichoptera	12,627	
	↳	Zoraptera	28	
	↳	Zygentoma (Thysanura)	370	
↳	Arachnida		102,248	~600,000
↳	Pycnogonida		1,340	unknown
↳	Myriapoda		16,072	~90,000
↳	Crustacea		47,000	150,000
↳	Onychophora		165	~220
↳	non-Insect Hexapoda		9,048	52,000
↳	Mollusca		~85,000	~200,000
↳	Annelida		16,763	~30,000
↳	Nematoda		<25,000	~500,000
↳	Acanthocephala		1,150	~1,500
↳	Platyhelminthes		20,000	~80,000
↳	Cnidaria		9,795	unknown
↳	Porifera		~6,000	~18,000
↳	Other Invertebrates		12,673	~20,000
	↳	Placozoa	1	-
	↳	Monoblastozoa	1	-
	↳	Mesozoa (Rhombozoa, Orthonectida)	106	-
	↳	Ctenophora	166	200
	↳	Nemertea (Nemertina)	1,200	5,000–10,000
	↳	Rotifera	2,180	-
	↳	Gastrotricha	400	-
	↳	Kinorhyncha	130	-
	↳	Nematomorpha	331	~2,000
	↳	Entoprocta (Kamptozoa)	170	170
	↳	Gnathostomulida	97	-
	↳	Priapulida	16	-
	↳	Loricifera	28	>100
	↳	Cycliophora	1	-
	↳	Sipuncula	144	-
	↳	Echiura	176	-
	↳	Tardigrada	1,045	-
	↳	Phoronida	10	-
	↳	Ectoprocta (Bryozoa)	5,700	~5,000
	↳	Brachiopoda	550	-
	↳	Pentastomida	100	-
	↳	Chaetognatha	121	-
Plants sens. lat.			~310,129	~390,800
↳	Bryophyta		16,236	~22,750
	↳	Liverworts	~5,000	~7,500
	↳	Hornworts	236	~250
	↳	Mosses	~11,000	~15,000
↳	Algae (Plant)		12,272	unknown
	↳	Charophyta	2,125	-
	↳	Chlorophyta	4,045	-
	↳	Glaucophyta	5	-
	↳	Rhodophyta	6,097	-
↳	Vascular Plants		281,621	~368,050
	↳	Ferns and allies	~12,000	~15,000
	↳	Gymnosperms	~1,021	~1,050
	↳	Magnoliophyta	~268,600	~352,000
Fungi			98,998 (incl. Lichens 17,000)	1,500,000 (incl. Lichens ~25,000)
Others			~66,307	~2,600,500
↳	Chromista [incl. brown algae, diatoms and other groups]		25,044	~200,500
↳	Protoctista [i.e. residual protist groups]		~28,871	>1,000,000
↳	Prokaryota [ Bacteria and Archaea, excl. Cyanophyta]		7,643	~1,000,000
↳	Cyanophyta		2,664	unknown
↳	Viruses		2,085	400,000
Total (2009 data)			1,899,587	~11,327,630

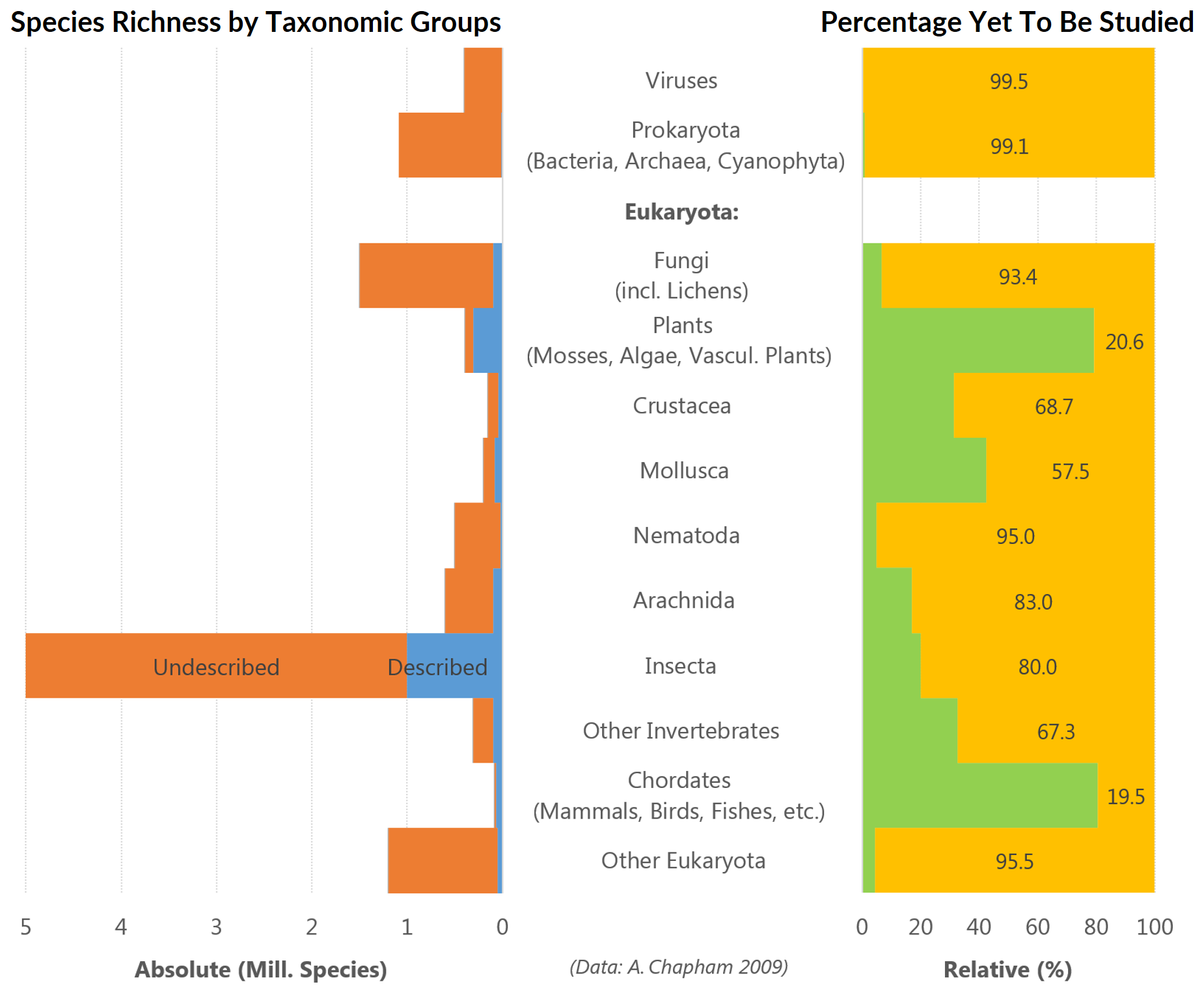
The distribution of numbers of known and undescribed (estimated) species on Earth, grouped by major taxonomic groups; according to Chapman 2009. Absolute number of species on the left (orange = estimated number of yet to be described species, blue = already described). Right: percentage of species already described (green) and estimated to be not yet known (yellow).

== Estimates of total number of species ==
However the total number of species for some taxa may be much higher.

- 10–30 million insects;
- 5–10 million bacteria;
- 1.5 million fungi;
- ~1 million mites
- ~1 million protists

In 1982, Terry Erwin published an estimate of global species richness of 30 million, by extrapolating from the numbers of beetles found in a species of tropical tree. In one species of tree, Erwin identified 1200 beetle species, of which he estimated 163 were found only in that type of tree. Given the 50,000 described tropical tree species, Erwin suggested that there are almost 10 million beetle species in the tropics. In 2011 a study published in PLoS Biology estimated there to be 8.7 million ± 1.3 million eukaryotic species on Earth.

By 2017, most estimates projected there to be around 11 million species or fewer on Earth. A 2017 study estimated there are at least 1 to 6 billion species, 70-90% of which are bacteria. A May 2016 study based on scaling laws estimated that 1 trillion species (overwhelmingly microbes) are on Earth currently with only one-thousandth of one percent described, though this has been controversial and a 2019 study of varied environmental samples of 16S ribosomal RNA estimated that there exist 0.8-1.6 million species of prokaryotes.

== Indices to describe trends ==
After the Convention on Biological Diversity was signed in 1992, biological conservation became a priority for the international community. There are several indicators used that describe trends in global biodiversity. However, there is no single indicator for all extant species as not all have been described and measured over time. There are different ways to measure changes in biodiversity. The Living Planet Index (LPI) is a population-based indicator that combines data from individual populations of many vertebrate species to create a single index. The Global LPI for 2012 decreased by 28%. There are also indices that separate temperate and tropical species for marine and terrestrial species.

The Red List Index is based on the IUCN Red List of Threatened Species and measures changes in conservation status over time and currently includes taxa that have been completely categorized: mammals, birds, amphibians and corals. The Global Wild Bird Index is another indicator that shows trends in populations of wild bird groups on a regional scale from data collected in formal surveys. Challenges to these indices due to data availability are taxonomic gaps and the length of time of each index.

The Biodiversity Indicators Partnership was established in 2006 to assist biodiversity indicator development, advancement and to increase the availability of indicators.

== Biodiversity loss ==
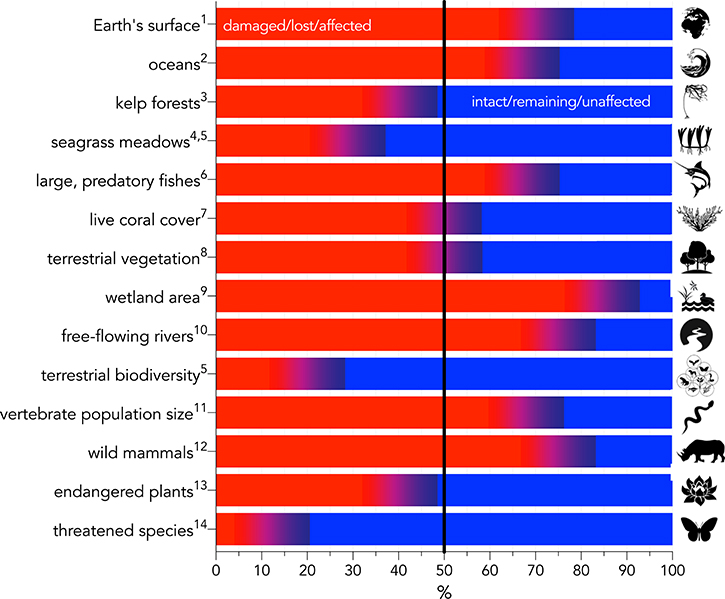
Summary of major environmental-change categories that cause biodiversity loss. The data is expressed as a percentage of human-driven change (in red) relative to baseline (blue), as of 2021. Red indicates the percentage of the category that is damaged, lost, or otherwise affected, whereas blue indicates the percentage that is intact, remaining, or otherwise unaffected.

Biodiversity loss happens when species disappear completely from Earth (extinction) or when there is a decrease or disappearance of species in a specific area. Biodiversity loss means that there is a reduction in biological diversity in a given area. The decrease can be temporary or permanent. It is temporary if the damage that led to the loss is reversible in time, for example through ecological restoration.If this is not possible, then the decrease is permanent. The cause of most of the biodiversity loss is, generally speaking, human activities that push the planetary boundaries too far. These activities include habitat destruction (for example deforestation) and land use intensification (for example monoculture farming). Further problem areas are air and water pollution (including nutrient pollution), over-exploitation, invasive species and climate change.

Many scientists, along with the Global Assessment Report on Biodiversity and Ecosystem Services, say that the main reason for biodiversity loss is a growing human population because this leads to human overpopulation and excessive consumption. Others disagree, saying that loss of habitat is caused mainly by "the growth of commodities for export" and that population has little to do with overall consumption. More important are wealth disparities between and within countries. In any case, all contemporary biodiversity loss has been attributed to human activities.

Climate change is another threat to global biodiversity. For example, coral reefs—which are biodiversity hotspots—will be lost by the year 2100 if global warming continues at the current rate. Additionally, the change of temperatures are likely to increase fire activity driving events such as forest fires. Still, it is the general habitat destruction (often for expansion of agriculture), not climate change, that is currently the bigger driver of biodiversity loss. Invasive species and other disturbances have become more common in forests in the last several decades. These tend to be directly or indirectly connected to climate change and can cause a deterioration of forest ecosystems.

Groups that care about the environment have been working for many years to stop the decrease in biodiversity. Nowadays, many global policies include activities to stop biodiversity loss. For example, the UN Convention on Biological Diversity aims to prevent biodiversity loss and to conserve wilderness areas. However, a 2020 United Nations Environment Programme report found that most of these efforts had failed to meet their goals. For example, of the 20 biodiversity goals laid out by the Aichi Biodiversity Targets in 2010, only six were "partially achieved" by 2020.

This ongoing global extinction is also called the holocene extinction or sixth mass extinction.

== See also ==
- Global Species Database
- Measurement of biodiversity
