= Zeta diversity =

Measure of biodiversity

In ecology, zeta diversity (ζ-diversity), first described in 2014, measures the degree of overlap in the type of taxa present between a set of observed communities. It was developed to provide a more generalized framework for describing various measures of diversity, and can also be used to test various hypotheses pertaining to biogeography.

== Zeta diversity as an extension of other measures of diversity ==
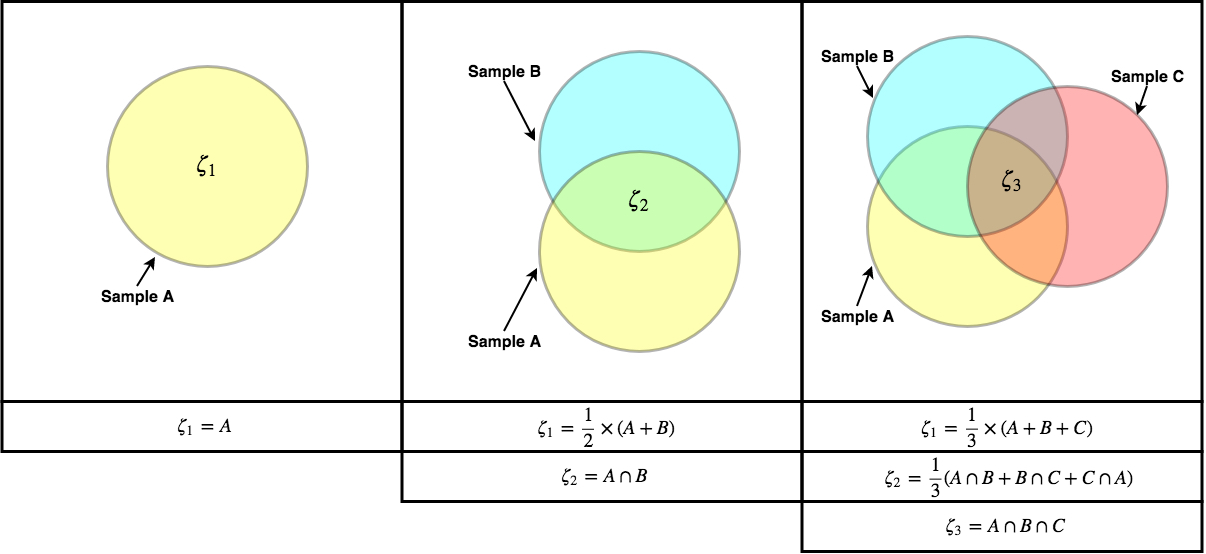
An illustration of the first three orders of ζ-diversity.

=== α-diversity ===
The most basic measure of community diversity, alpha diversity (α-diversity), can be described as the average number of distinct taxonomic groups (e.g. unique genera or operational taxonomic unit) present, independent of their abundances, on a per sample basis. In the ζ-diversity framework this can be described as ζ_{1}, the number of unique taxa present in one sample.

=== β-diversity ===
Beta diversity (β-diversity) is a measure to allow for a comparison between the diversity of local communities (α-diversity). The greater the similarity in community composition between multiple communities, the lower the value of β-diversity for that set of communities. Using the number of distinct taxonomic groups per community as a measure of α-diversity one can then describe β-diversity between two communities in terms of distinct number taxonomic groups held in common between them. Given two communities, A and B, a measure β-diversity between both communities can be described in terms of their overlap A ∩ B (ζ_{2}) as well as the average number of unique taxonomic categories found in A and B (ζ_{1}). In the framework of ζ-diversity we can then describe the average β-diversity, as described by the Jaccard index, for a set of samples as $\frac{\zeta_{2}}{2\zeta_{1}-\zeta_{2}}$

=== Multi-site assemblages ===
The framework then for ζ-diversity can then be extended beyond measures of diversity in one (α-diversity), or between two communities (β-diversity), to describing diversity across sets of three or more communities. If ζ_{1} describes the number of distinct taxa in community A, and ζ_{2} describes the number of distinct taxa held in common between communities A and B, then ζ_{n} describes the number of distinct taxa held in common across n communities.
