= Pollinator Pathway (organization) =

Nonprofit focused on pollinator conservation

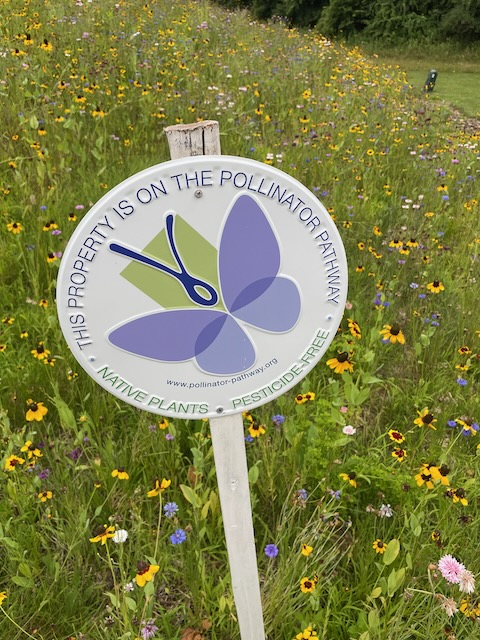
- Pollinator Pathway sign in a wildflower meadow
- Formation: 2017
- Type: 501(c)(3) nonprofit
- Tax ID no.: 87-2704374
- Purpose: Pollinator conservation & habitat restoration
- Headquarters: Wilton, Connecticut
- Board Chair: Donna Merrill
- Executive Director: Jana Hogan
- Website: pollinator-pathway.org

Pollinator Pathway is a grassroots nonprofit conservation organization founded in Wilton, Connecticut. Its mission is to create, restore, and connect pollinator-friendly habitat corridors across towns and communities in the United States by encouraging residents, businesses, municipalities to plant native species and avoid use of pesticides. The pathway has expanded to more than 300 towns nationwide.

== History ==
Pollinator Pathway got its start in 2017 when conservationists Donna Merrill, then a member of the Hudson-to-Housatonic Regional Conservation Partnership, and Louise Washer launched a community-based project in Wilton, Connecticut, to promote native plant habitat corridors for pollinators. The approach sought to promote pollinator-friendly plantings and to "de-fragment" landscapes by connecting public and private gardens, yards, local land trust properties, parks and green spaces.

Backed by local conservation groups and land trusts, the initiative grew beyond Wilton into nearby Connecticut towns and communities in New York. As each town adopted its own "Pathway," the concept grew into a regional corridor, and similar efforts have taken root in communities from coast to coast.

In 2021, Pollinator Pathway formally incorporated as a 501(c)(3) nonprofit, establishing a board of directors and expanding its mission to support a network of community-led Pathway projects nationally.

== Mission and activities ==
Pollinator Pathway's stated mission is to support people and communities working together to restore and connect habitat for native pollinators and other wildlife. The group promotes the planting of native trees, shrubs, and pollinator-friendly plants, encourages the reduction of pesticides and lawn chemicals, and encourages property owners to convert portions of lawns into "way-stations" for pollinators. The organization distributes resources including native plant lists, garden design guidance, webinars, and community toolkits, and collaborates with conservation groups, garden clubs, and other local organizations. Participating property owners register individual gardens or town projects on a national Pollinator Pathway map to illustrate the semi-continuous corridors of pollinator habitat.

== Regional pathway projects ==
Pollinator Pathway Stamford, Connecticut, enrolled 370 residents, transforming 531 acres of habitat into a pathway for pollinators and other wildlife. The group also worked to pass a new state law that prohibits the use of neonicotinoid pesticides on lawns and golf courses starting in October 2027.

Ridgefield and Redding, Connecticut, expanded the pathway by linking residential gardens, parks, and open spaces and formed a regional, multi-town habitat corridor.

Westchester County, New York, communities adopted the Pollinator Pathway framework with local garden clubs, libraries, and environmental organizations. The collaboration installed native plant gardens on municipal land, school grounds, and other public spaces.

The Pollinator Pathway Northwest initiative in Woodinville, Washington, is based at the 21 Acres Center, where volunteers maintain a demonstration pollinator garden used for public education.

Pollinator Pathway of Licking County, Ohio, created the Meadows for Monarchs Project which provides training and native seed mixes to landowners who convert unused grassy areas into pollinator habitat.

Franklin County, Ohio, Pollinator Pathway installed pollinator gardens and rain gardens at churches and schools and advocated for changes to the City of Columbus property maintenance code to remove milkweed from the weed list and to allow for native plant gardens.

== Relationship to the original pollinator pathway concept ==
The organization’s concept drew inspiration from an earlier Pollinator Pathway design project founded by Seattle artist Sarah Bergmann in 2007. Bergmann’s initiative aimed to connect urban green spaces in Seattle through corridors of flowering plants, coining the term "pollinator pathway." Although the Wilton-based nonprofit movement is legally and organizationally independent, the historical roots of the idea trace back to Bergmann’s work, providing foundational conceptual influence. The two initiatives operate separately and are not organizationally or administratively connected.

== Recognition and media coverage ==
Pollinator Pathway has been featured in media coverage including a 2022 CBS News segment, which highlighted the movement’s growth beyond Connecticut and its focus on reducing lawn pesticides and supporting native habitat corridors. The initiative has also received attention in environmental press, regional conservation publications and local media.

== See also ==
- Decline in insect populations
- Habitat fragmentation
- Pollinator decline
- Pollinator garden
- Pollinator Partnership
- The Pollinator Pathway
- Urban rewilding
- Wildflower strip
- Wildlife corridor
- Wildlife garden
