= The Pollinator Pathway =

Interactive biodiversity project in Washington state

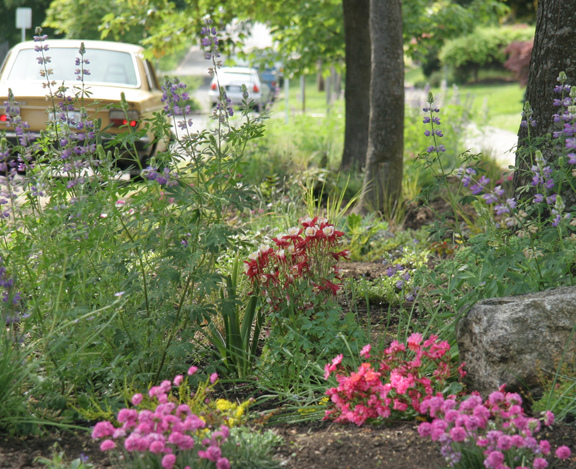
- Pollinator pathway native flower plot
- Formation: c. 2008
- Founder: Sarah Bergmann
- Location: Seattle, Washington
- Volunteers: Volunteer planters and garden adopters (c. 20 gardens as of 2014)
- Website: pollinatorpathway.com

The Pollinator Pathway is a participatory art, design and ecology social sculpture initiative founded by the artist and designer Sarah Bergmann. Its objective is to connect existing isolated green spaces and create a more hospitable urban environment for pollinators like bees with a system of ecological corridors of flowering plants by using existing urban infrastructure such as curb space and rooftops.

== Pathways ==
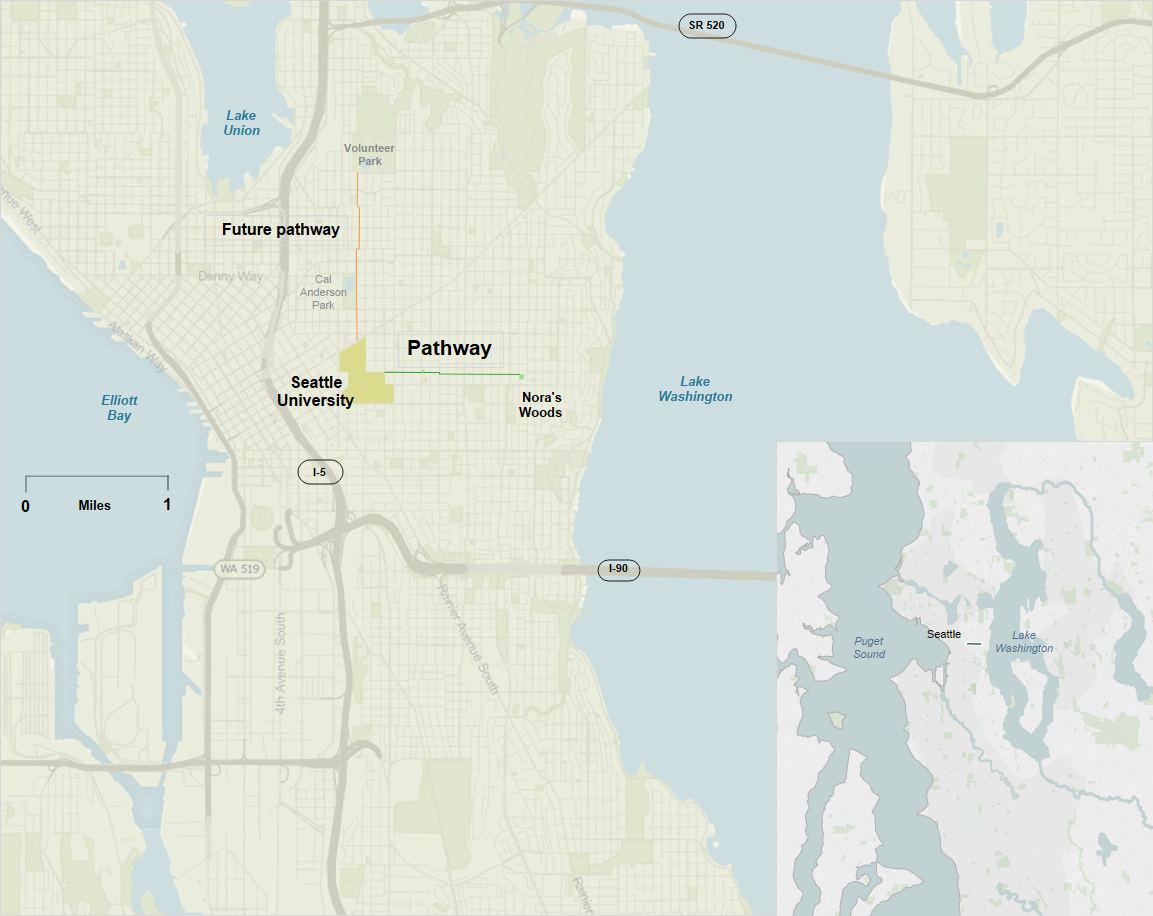
The Columbia Street pollinator pathway segment near downtown Seattle, Washington runs east-west from Nora's Woods to Seattle University. A planned extension connects north to Volunteer Park.

The first pollinator pathway (47°36′33.60″N 122°18′26.40″W) is located on Seattle, Washington's east-west Columbia Street, and connects Seattle University's campus on 12th Avenue to Nora's Woods on 29th Avenue one mile (1.6 km) away, crossing one third of Seattle's width. A second 1.5-mile (2.4 km) long official pollinator pathway is slated for Seattle's north-south 11th Avenue, connecting Seattle University's campus to Volunteer Park.

The first segment of the pathway on Columbia Street, which Bergmann received grants from the City of Seattle, Northwest Horticultural Society, and Awesome Foundation to create, replaced a 108-foot (33 m) long, 12-foot (3.7 m) grass strip between the street and sidewalk with plants that could attract pollinators. The pathways are composed of individual plots of perennial native plant species on city-owned property, tended by local volunteers. (Note: "[T]he artist works with each homeowner along the Pathway, as well as with designers, entomologists, botanists, landscape designers, urban planners, students and a host of volunteers". (Seattle Art Museum [SAM]))

Bergmann had a related installation, Portal to The Pollinator Pathway, at Seattle Art Museum's Olympic Sculpture Park in 2012. (Note: Described by SAM as "[a] garden containing native plants that attract pollinators such as bees, birds, and butterflies ... [that] provides a glimpse of a much more ambitious project".) In 2014, she made presentations on the project at Frye Art Museum and Seattle Tilth.

== Certification ==
Since late 2013, Bergmann has offered a certification program for new pathways to use the trademarked Pollinator Pathway name.

== Other cities ==
Cities other than Seattle have explored the idea of connecting landscapes for pollinators. In 2008, about the same time the Seattle project was getting under way, the Canadian Pollination Initiative wrote a paper on a "pollinator park" concept to include "...right-of-way passages, including highways, power lines, gas lines and other maintained corridors can be designed in such a way that they serve as pollinator habitats."

In 2011, a New York author and artist Aaron Birk wrote an illustrated story, The Pollinator's Corridor, about a pathway connecting the city's landscape.

=== City–citizen discussions ===
Several cities have used official means to initiate citizen discussions on their own pollinator pathways following Seattle's model, including Redmond, Washington; the Niagara Falls, New York area; and Los Angeles, California via the mayor's blog.

== Awards ==
In 2012, Bergmann received The Stranger's Genius Award and Seattle Art Museum's Betty Bowen Award for the project. In 2013, she was named one of Seattle's most influential people of the year by Seattle Magazine, along with recipients of the award who had created other Seattle area pollinator conservation projects.

== See also ==
- Decline in insect populations
- Habitat fragmentation
- Pollinator decline
- Pollinator garden
- Pollinator Partnership
- Pollinator Pathway (organization)
- Urban rewilding
- Wildflower strip
- Wildlife corridor
- Wildlife garden
