= Snetsinger Butterfly Garden =

Butterfly garden in Pennsylvania, United States

- Interactive map of Snetsinger Butterfly Garden
- Type: Public pollinator garden
- Location: State College, Pennsylvania, United States
- Coordinates: 40°48′2″N 77°53′46″W
- Area: Approximately 3 acres
- Operator: Ferguson Township
- Status: Open to the public

The Snetsinger Butterfly Garden is a pollinator habitat and educational garden located within Tom Tudek Memorial Park in State College, Pennsylvania. The garden is designed to support butterflies, bees, and other pollinators through the use of native plants and habitat restoration practices.

== History ==
The garden was developed through local conservation efforts and is named in honor of Robert "Butterfly Bob" Snetsinger, a naturalist known for his interest in butterflies and environmental education. It was formally named the Snetsinger Butterfly Garden in 2011.

== Design and features ==
The garden covers approximately three acres and contains a diverse range of native plant species selected to support pollinators throughout their life cycles. The site includes both nectar plants for adult butterflies and host plants that support caterpillars.

According to Penn State Extension, the garden contains around 90 species of native plants and supports more than 30 species of butterflies, along with bees and other beneficial insects. The use of native vegetation is intended to improve ecological resilience and provide habitat within a managed park environment.

== Ecological importance ==
The Snetsinger Butterfly Garden contributes to regional pollinator conservation by providing habitat in an urban setting. Pollinator gardens are considered an important strategy for addressing declines in insect populations by increasing the availability of food sources and breeding habitat.

The garden also supports broader biodiversity, including birds and other wildlife associated with native plant ecosystems.

== Education and community use ==
The garden serves as an outdoor educational site for environmental learning and community engagement. It is used for guided tours, plant identification, and programs focused on pollinator ecology.

An annual event known as "Wings in the Park" is held at the site, featuring educational activities and demonstrations related to butterflies and pollinators.

== See also ==
- Pollinator garden
- Native plants
- Pollination
