= Lower Brandywine Presbyterian Church =

Church in Delaware, United States

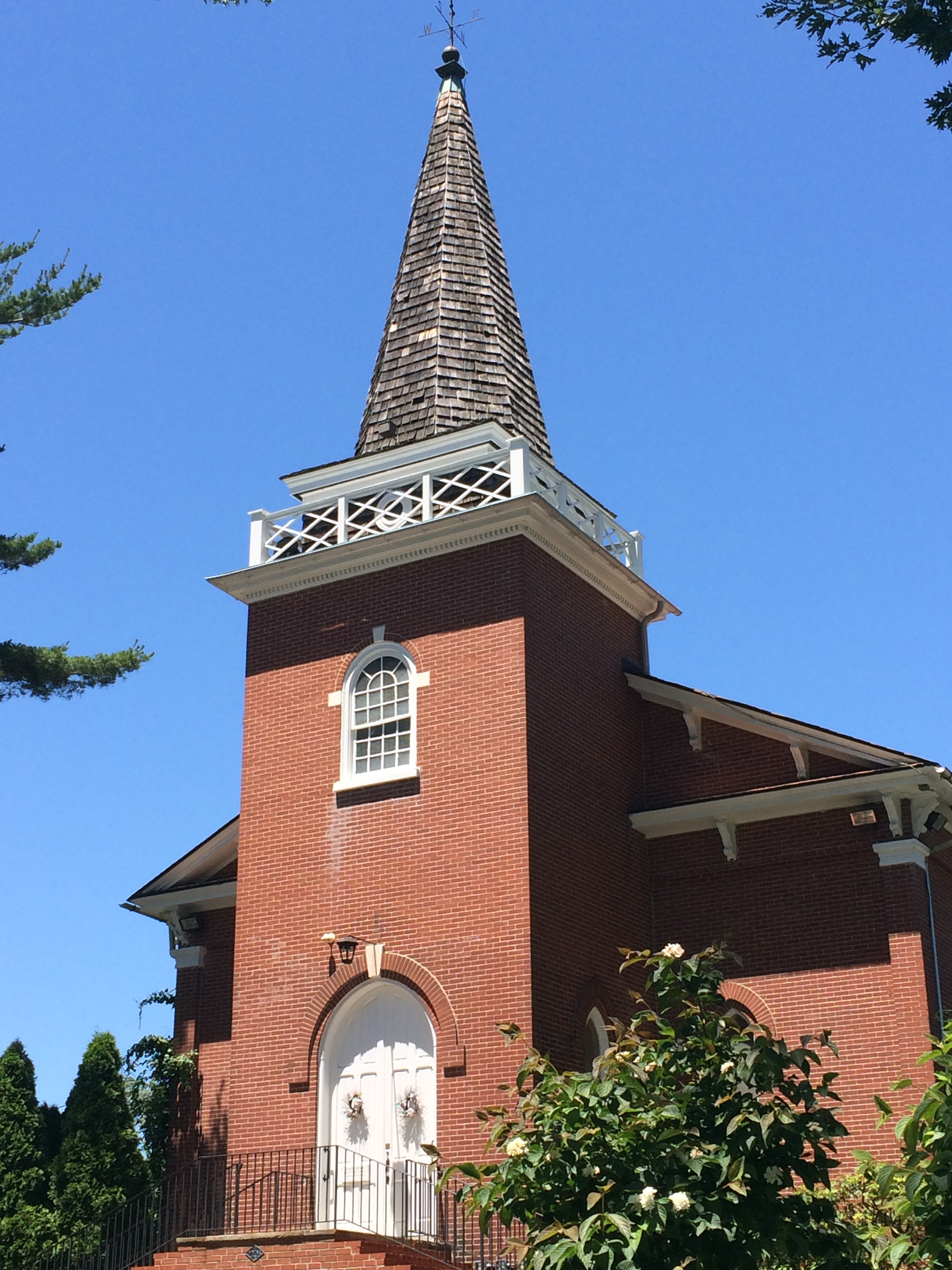

Religion
- Affiliation: Presbyterianism
- Deity: God
- Status: Open

Location
- Location: New Castle County, Delaware
- Country: United States
- Interactive map of Lower Brandywine Presbyterian Church
- Coordinates: 39.806213°N 75.613287°W

Architecture
- Completed: 1860

Website
- lowerbrandywine.org

Lower Brandywine Presbyterian Church is a congregation of the Presbyterian Church in New Castle County, Delaware, United States.

== History ==
Lower Brandywine Presbyterian Church was organized on October 15, 1720, as part of a greater trend of growth of Presbyterianism in northern Delaware. In 1773 the original congregation split into two distinct churches, after which a log church was built to accommodate the Delaware congregation. This church was used until 1860, when the current brick church was constructed at its present site. The steeple was added in 1929. The current church was renovated in 1992, and again in 2007.

=== Cemetery ===
The church grounds encompass a 10-acre (4.0 ha) cemetery.

=== Pollinator garden ===
In 2017 the church established a pollinator garden on its property.

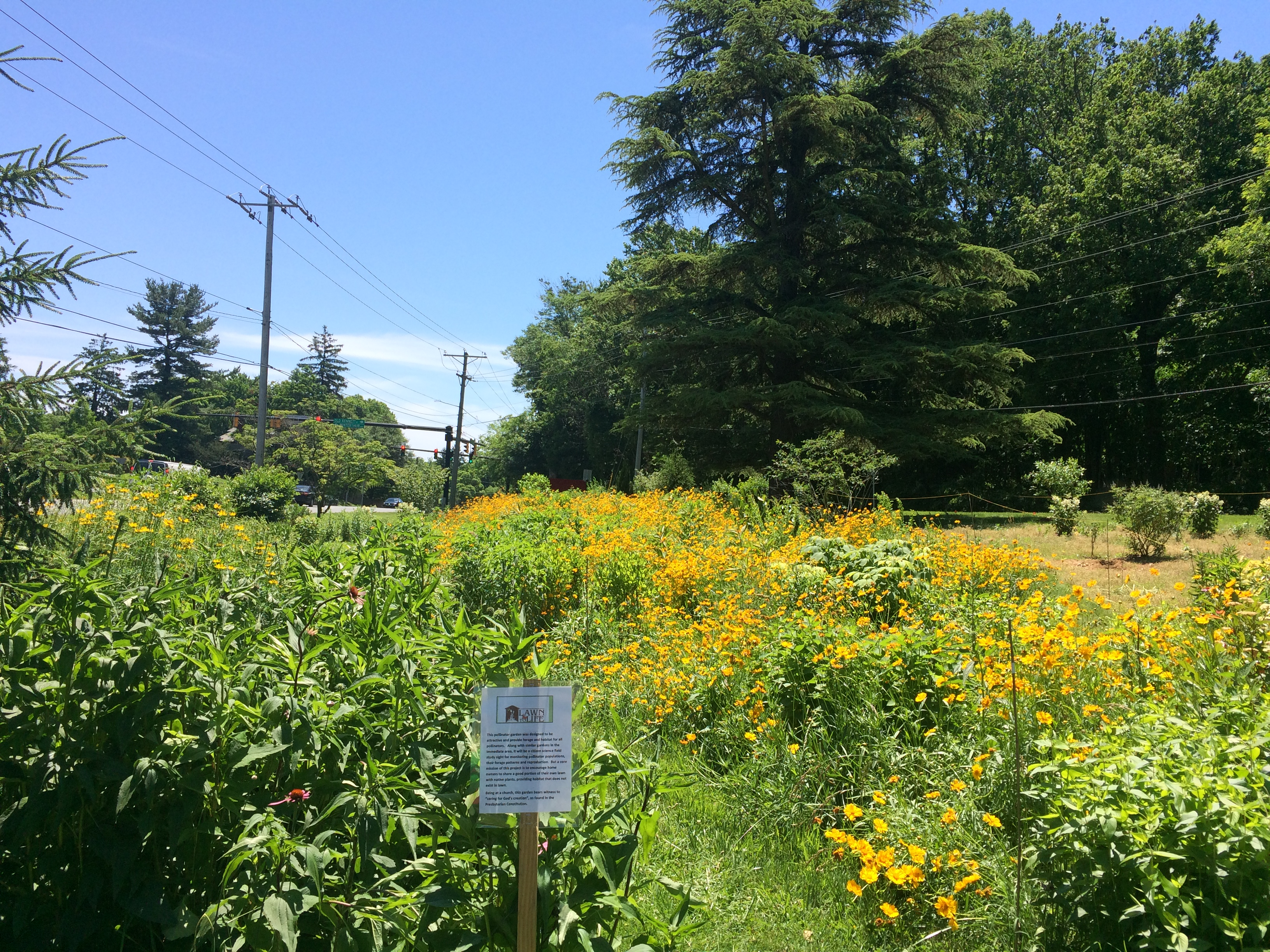
Lower Brandywine Presbyterian Church's pollinator garden
