= Nora's Woods =

Park and garden in Seattle, Washington, U.S.

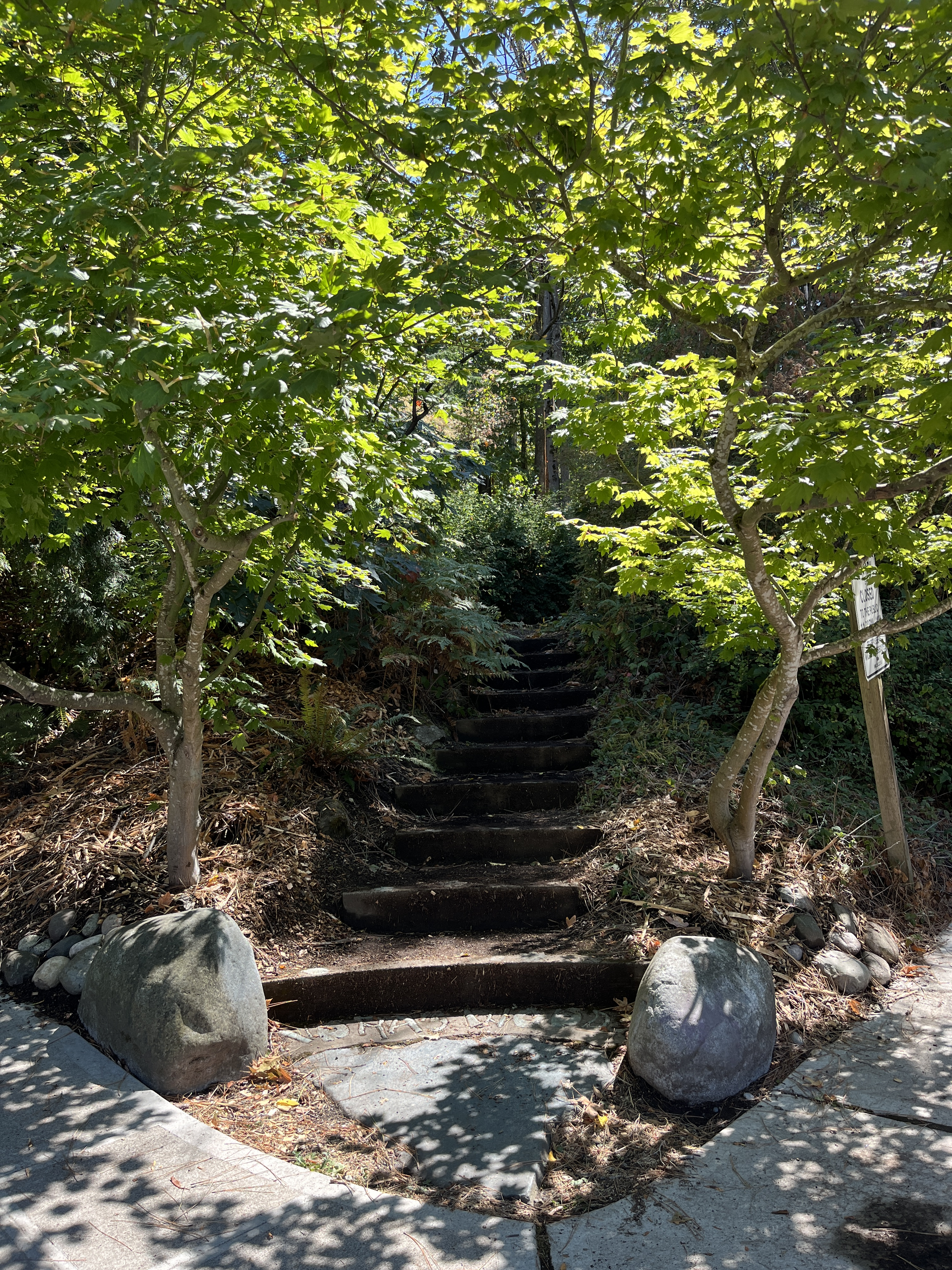
- Entrance, 2024
- Interactive map of Nora's Woods
- Location: 720 29th Ave (29th and Columbia St.)
- Nearest city: Seattle
- Coordinates: 47°36′31″N 122°17′41″W
- Created: c. 1996
- Operator: Seattle Parks and Recreation
- Open: 1998

Nora's Woods is a forested city park and native plant garden in the Madrona neighborhood of Seattle, Washington. The 0.35-acre (0.14 ha) house lot-sized wooded area is named for Seattleite Nora Wood, who purchased the land in 1987 that was given to The Trust for Public Land after her death in 1989. Cleanup of the overgrown and neglected property by neighborhood volunteers to create the park began in 1996 or 1997. In 1998, it became a city park.

The Columbia Street pollinator pathway connects Nora's Woods to the 18th Avenue P-Patch and the Seattle University campus.

Nora Wood's ashes are buried in Nora's Woods Park.
