= Urban rewilding =

Form of ecological restoration

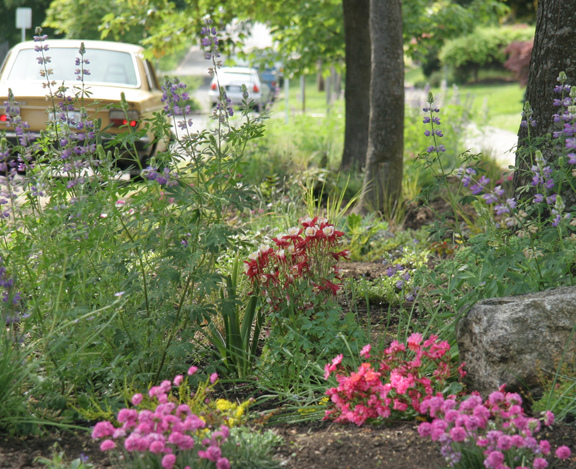
The Pollinator Pathway wildlife corridor in downtown Seattle, Washington, USA is an example of an urban rewilding project designed to create a more hospitable urban environment for pollinators.

Urban rewilding is a specific form of rewilding, a movement that gained prominence in the 1990s. Urban rewilding aims to integrate ecosystems into cities, blending nature and urban settings. This nature can be anything from vegetation to animals. Despite different ideologies existing on the most effective way to rewild urban areas successfully, research shows that positive benefits ensue as long as some form of rewilding takes place. While some countries take more drastic measures than others, urban rewilding occurs globally in countries such as the U.S., Bangladesh, South Africa, China, Singapore, the U.K, Australia, India, and more.

== Different types of urban rewilding ==
There are four types of urban rewilding: urban greening, corridors, small scale, and large scale.

=== Urban greening ===
While urban greening is not fully considered urban rewilding, it is still the first step to introducing ecosystems into urban areas. Urban greening is the process of ingraining natural ecosystems into the city environment for multifunctional use. It is typically used in infrastructure with limited space to include a proper rewilding project. This type of urban rewilding can be found in Dhaka, Bangladesh (Sultana) and Brownfield sites throughout the U.K.

=== Corridors ===
In the context of urban rewilding, corridors connect habitats so that animals in cities can freely move throughout the urban environment. Restored bodies of water or green pathways are examples of corridors. An example of corridors can be found in Hebei Province, China.

=== Small scale ===
A small-scale urban rewilding project is under 50 hectares and involves restoring distinct urban landscape elements within an ecosystem. These projects include restoring parks, gardens, and forests. Examples of this type of project include the renaturing of community gardens in New York City, renaturing pocket parks in Singapore, and providing urban wetlands in Melbourne, Australia.

=== Large scale ===
Urban rewilding projects are large scale when they are over 50 hectares and restore large areas to support healthy, self-sustaining habitats and wildlife. Large scale projects occur in green spaces, land types, marine reserves, and national parks. There are examples throughout the world, such as Kamla Nehru Ridge in India and Bishan-Ang Mo Kio Park in Singapore.

== Benefits and drawbacks ==
=== Benefits ===
Urban Rewilding causes multiple positive environmental, mental, and economic benefits. For example, greenery can help filter pollutants, creating cleaner air. Furthermore, urban rewilding projects have been found to lower carbon amounts, helping to fight climate change. Urban Rewilding leads to higher levels of pollination, soil fertility, and clean water. Alongside the physical benefits of providing cleaner air, urban rewilding also leads to decreased stress and an overall boost to mental health. Urban rewilding can lead to positive economic benefits due to increased tourism and the creating of jobs as people are needed to sustain these projects.

=== Drawbacks ===
The combination of initial investments and long-term funding required makes urban rewilding projects expensive. For example, the Buffelsdraai reforestation project's funding was about 138.5 million ZAR, which equals about 7.7 million USD. The Frédéric-Back Park project in Montreal, Canada has an estimated 140 million dollar developmental cost until 2032, with further investments not calculated. Furthermore, using land for urban rewilding projects has an opportunity cost. Property owners could utilize the land used in urban rewilding projects for a different purpose that is more economically beneficial. Generally speaking, the preservation of wildlife conflicts with human development and sustainability. For example, in areas like the Alps, wolves were reintroduced to their native habitat, and the locals were having issues with the wolves disrupting livestock.

== Global efforts ==
Urban rewilding is a global movement, evident in different countries.

=== Beijing, China ===
Through urban rewilding, Beijing, China, is becoming one of the most biodiverse cities in the world, containing 2088 vascular plant species and 596 wild vertebrates. China has continued to push rewilding projects into Beijing through wetland protection and the afforestation of a million acres. While Beijing is diligently trying to maintain its ecosystems and nature, it still faces environmental threats from climate change. For example, in Beijing, 2012-2023 was the warmest decade in the past 70 years, and an increase in waterfalls damaged local ecosystems. More urban rewilding projects in Beijing are required to help tackle said problems.

=== Frankfurt, Germany, Dessau-Roßlau, Germany, and Hannover, Germany ===
All three German cities participated in a project from 2016-2021 called "Städte wagen Wildnis," which translates to "Cities Dare Wilderness" or "Cities Venturing into Wilderness". The project aimed to conserve species and increase the quality of life for the local populations. These cities achieved their goal by setting aside plots of land like parks, vacant lots, and old buildings and letting nature naturally develop in these locations. The project succeeded as in these cities greater drought tolerance and increased wildlife, such as bees, birds, and butterflies, were noticed. Near threatened locust species were sighted in Frankfurt following the initiation of this plan.

=== Barcelona, Spain ===
Due to a 6 week lockdown in April 2020, nature grew throughout Barcelona, Spain. With the new nature creating a positive effect on citizens, the city took the opportunity to instill new rules and laws to further urban rewilding. Weeds are now allowed to grow in public spaces, and they installed 80 insect hotel gardens, 40 beehives, and 200 bird and bat nesting towers. Furthermore, the city aims to create 783,000 square meters of green open space with 49,000 square meters of "greened streets." On top of that, the city also has a nature plan for 2030 with the primary goal of increasing the amount of "green infrastructure" throughout the city to combat climate change and increase overall quality of life. The city is pushing this plan through multiple agendas, such as ensuring the conservation of trees and increasing the amount of quality urban agriculture land.

=== Durban, South Africa ===
The Buffelsdraai reforestation project took place in Durban, South Africa. The project's motivation was to create a buffer between the city of Durban and local landfill sites to increase quality of life through a positive stimulation of the local economy, cleaner air and water, cooler temperatures for locals, and flood protection. Jobless locals planted trees in the buffer zone in return for free food and other services. Furthermore, over 500 new jobs were created due to this project. This project has been recognized globally for its success by institutions such as the United Nations Framework Convention on Climate Change.

== See also ==
- Biomanipulation
- Guerrilla gardening
- Natural landscaping
- Reconciliation ecology
- Trophic cascade
- Wildlife garden
