= Wildlife garden =

Environment created as a habitat for surrounding wildlife

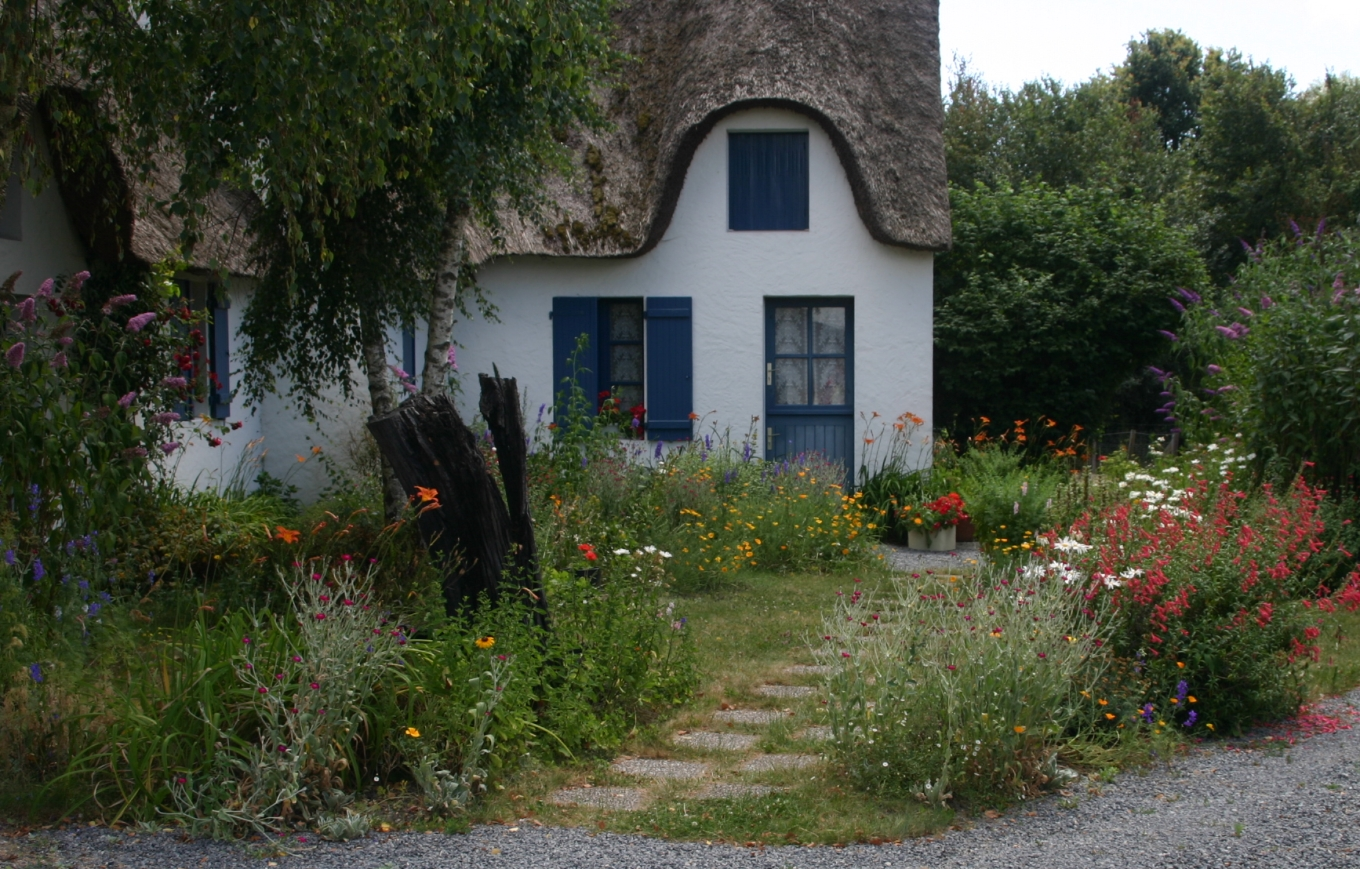
A wildlife garden (in the Loire-Atlantique in western France).

A wildlife garden (or habitat garden or backyard restoration) is an environment created with the purpose to serve as a sustainable haven for surrounding wildlife. Wildlife gardens contain a variety of habitats that cater to native and local plants, birds, amphibians, reptiles, insects, mammals and so on, and are meant to sustain locally native flora and fauna. Other names this type of gardening goes by can vary, prominent ones being habitat, ecology, and conservation gardening.

Both public and private gardens can be specifically transformed to attract the native wildlife, and in doing so, provide a natural array of support through available shelter and sustenance. This method of gardening can be a form of restoration in private gardens as much as those in public, as they contribute to connectivity due to the variability of their scattered locations, as well as an increased habitat availability.

Establishing a garden that emulates the environment before the residence was built and/or renders the garden similar to intact wild areas nearby (rewilding) will allow natural systems to interact and establish an equilibrium, ultimately minimizing the need for gardener maintenance and intervention. Wildlife gardens can also play an essential role in biological pest control, and also promote biodiversity, native plantings, and generally benefit the wider environment. Some environmental benefits include the reduction in pest populations through the natural mechanism of biological pest control, by helping reduce the need for pesticides. Habitat gardens also provide the environment an ecosystem service by recharging aquifers by intercepting rainfall.

== Purpose ==
Anthropogenic activities such as land development and urbanization are major drivers of habitat destruction, causing habitat loss and displacing wildlife as a result of increasing fragmentation. Fragmentation, among other human factors contributing to habitat loss, aside from constant land disturbance (such as the heavy use of pesticides), all contribute to large declines in wildlife populations and biodiversity.

By converting private green spaces in residential and commercial areas to wildlife or habitat gardens, residents can collectively assist restorative and conservation efforts in providing more spaces for wildlife to survive, and potentially strengthen ecological resilience in urban areas. Rewilding lawns can turn the garden into a carbon sink.

=== Planning ===
Planning a successful wildlife garden requires consideration of the area surroundings, and a focus on overall ecological functionality. Vegetative structure and complexity play an important role in the benefits the landscape will provide to the wildlife, through the varying plants serving as sources of food and cover for survival. In particular, planting native vegetation creates greater diversity in yards by providing habitat for birds, pollinators such as bees, and other wildlife, which results in their numbers in population growing. There are countless ways in which wildlife gardens can be built or converted, as long as food, water, shelter, and space are provided. The process will usually involve removing invasive species to replace with native species, retaining leaf litter as well as mature trees, assuring varying distribution of vegetation complexity and structure, and implementing other habitat elements such as ponds to include water sources. True to the nature of a habitat in the wild varying depending on its environment and the species inhabiting it, a wildlife garden can be built to resemble a desired habitat, with strategic features meant to attract desired birds or pollinators.

== Habitats ==
Building a successful garden suitable for local wildlife is best accomplished through the use of multiple three-dimensional habitats with diverse structures that provide places for animals to nest and hide. Wildlife gardens may contain a range of habitats, including:

Log piles – Preferably located in a shady area, a pile of logs is a sanctuary for insects and other invertebrates, as well as reptiles and amphibians. The organic structure is a shelter for both protection and breeding. In addition to logs, garden debris may also be added around the garden to be used as a natural mulch, fertilizer, weed control, soil amendment, and habitat for arthropods predators.

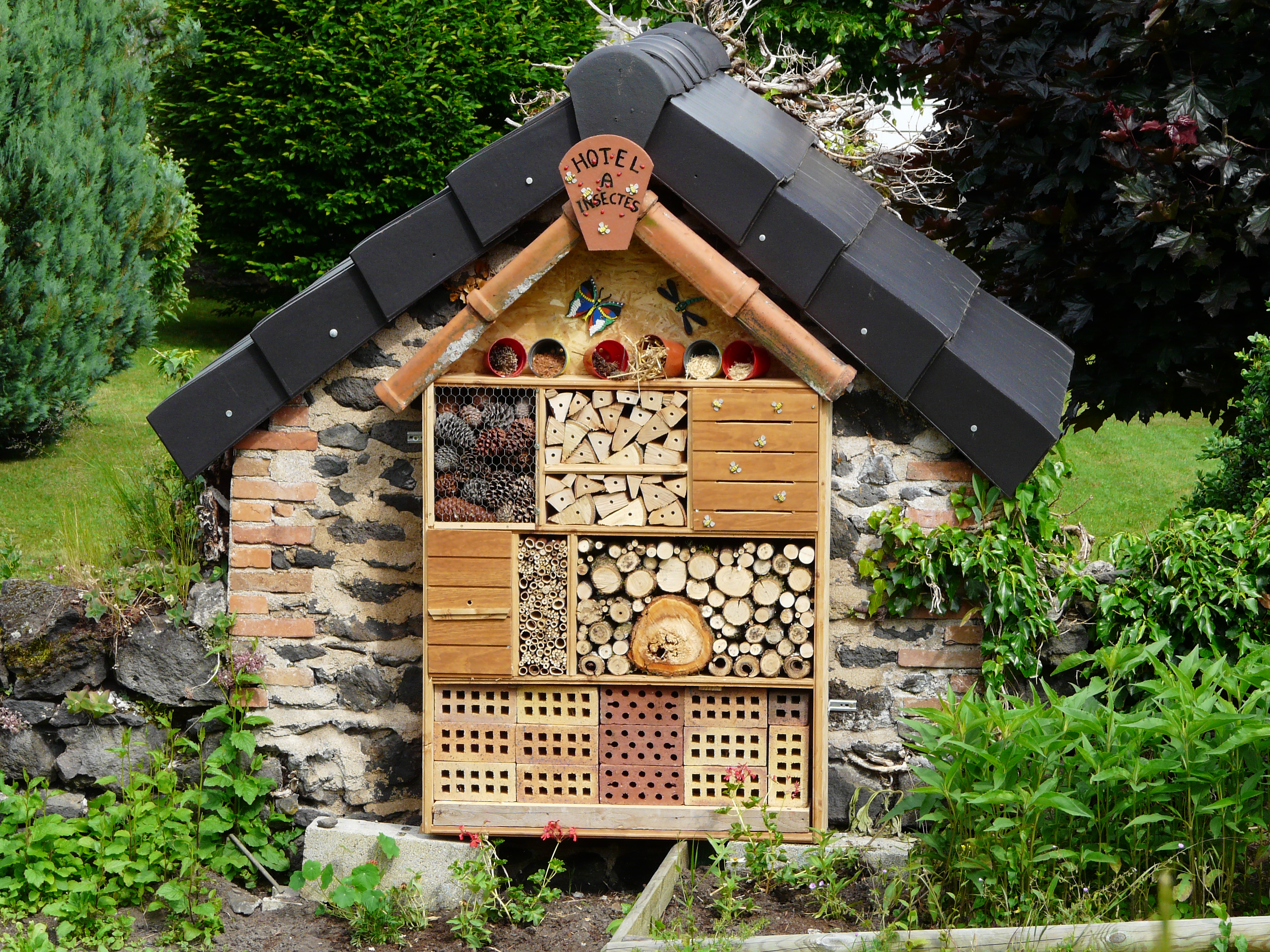
Insect house in Pontgibaud, Puy-de-Dôme, France

Bird feeding stations and bird houses – A place for birds to eat and take shelter will increase the number of birds in the garden, which play a key role in biological pest control. Not only will food and shelter increase the survival rate of birds, but it will also ensure that they are healthy enough for a successful breeding season.

Bug boxes and bee hotels – Bundles of hollow stems (elderberry, Joe-Pye weed, bamboo) can be hung up as an alternate place of shelter and breeding for beneficial insects, such as the Mason bee, which are valuable pollinators.

Sources of water – A water feature, such as a pond, has the potential to support a large biodiversity of wildlife. To maximize the amount of wildlife attracted to the water feature, it should consist of varying depths. Shallow areas are used by birds to drink and by insects and amphibians to lay eggs. Deeper areas provide habitat for aquatic insects and a place for amphibians, or even fish to swim.

Pollinators – Flowers rich in nectar will attract bees and butterflies into the garden, which is of particular importance given the dramatic reduction in pollinator populations in the US, Europe and elsewhere. Wildflower meadows are an alternative option for lawns in the garden and will serve as a sanctuary for pollinators. However, pollinating plants should not be confused with plants suitable for butterfly breeding.

Plant diversity – The garden should include a range of plant types to act as different habitats. A balance between ground cover, shrub, understory, and canopy species will allow different sized wildlife shelters, varying in height, that fit their individual needs. It is particularly important to use species that are native to the area or state, as native plants will more reliably be suited to insects and other invertebrates than many non-native plants; increased variety of insects is valuable both for its own sake and for birds and other predators. Programs like the National Wildlife Federation's Wildlife-Yard Certification program that provide certification to yards that contribute to the habitat of diverse species, provider higher native plant diversity, and diversify the bird population.

Horizontal structure is an important principle to plan when constructing habitats, as it is only natural that the landscape will gradually change over time due to the nature of wildlife gardening requiring less human maintenance such as mowing. Vegetation changes occur in successions, with a meadow eventually becoming a forest in its final stage after gradually being replaced with woody species; to achieve horizontal structure, vegetation must be arranged and interspersed in these different stages with some proximity, so that different wildlife species will be supported.

Vertical structure is also essential to the construction of the habitat. It is the inclusion of layers of plants that in such a way that it provides an efficient level of diversity as well as purpose in its arrangement. This is so that a broader arrangement of flora and fauna is provided. An example of a vertical structure is when a wildlife garden includes a mulch layer, herbaceous layer, shrub layer, tree layer. All layers can support various wildlife species as well as enhancing the diversity of plant life in a residential yard. Significant essential natural processes are also enhanced during the implementation of a vertical structure such as that of maintaining soil temperature, protection from erosion, decomposition, replenishment of nutrients, and additions to the food web.

== Choice of plants ==
Although some exotics may also be included, as discussed in the previous section, wild gardens usually mostly feature a variety of native species. Generally, these will be a part of the pre-existing natural ecology of an area, making them easier to grow than most exotic species. Choosing native plants comes with an array of benefits for both plant and animal diversity, especially the ability to support native insect and fungal populations.

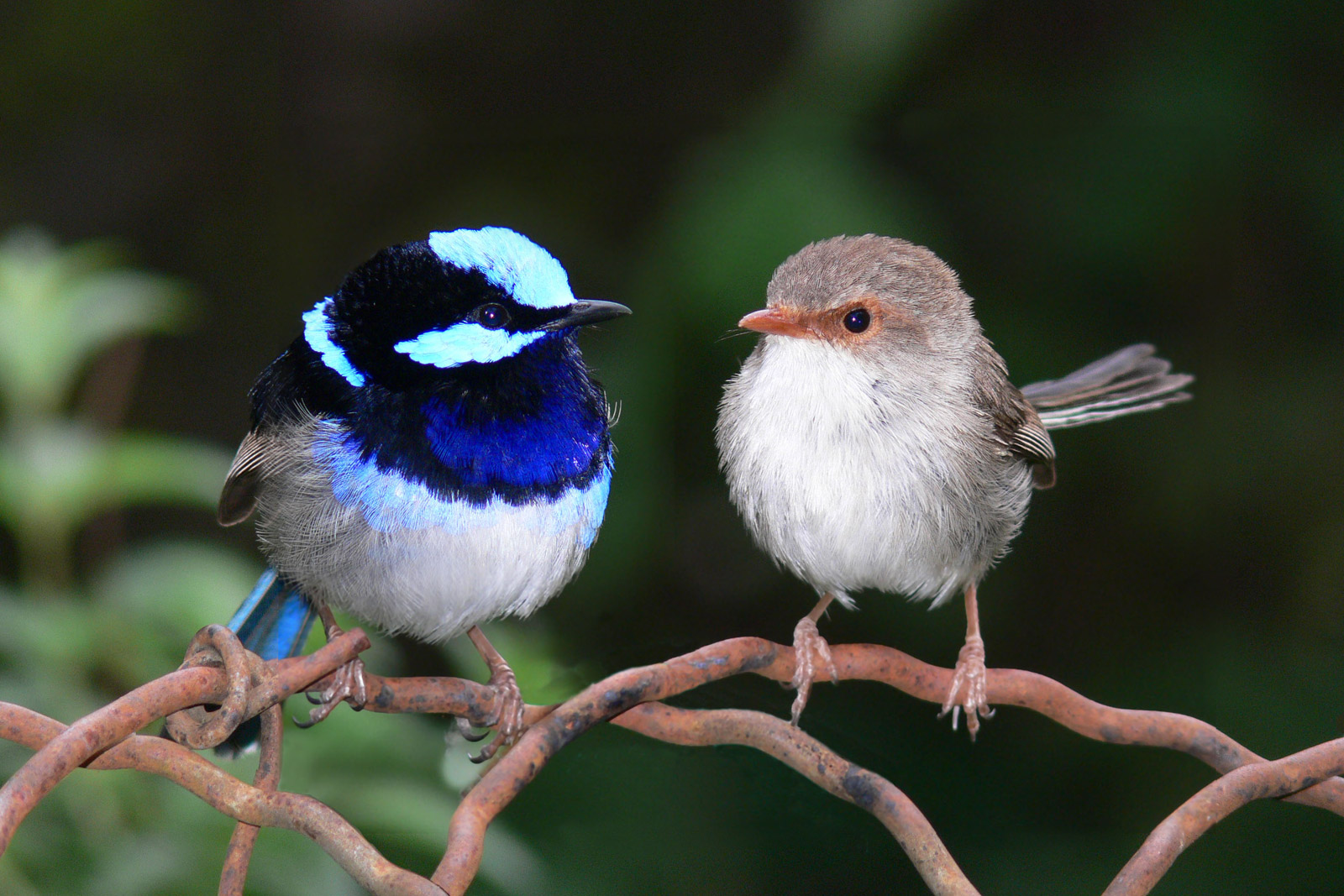
Male and female superb fairywren

Ornamental plants on the market tend to lean toward "pest-free" plants, making it hard for native insects to adapt, and ultimately reducing their food supply. Decreases in insect populations due to excessive ornamental planting will discourage bird populations from inhabiting the particular area.

Invasive species can always prove problematic in the garden due to the absence of natural predators and their ability to reproduce rapidly. Without any measures of control, invasive species can easily overtake native species in the garden. Addressing invasive plants can be done a variety of ways; however, to ensure the least amount of damage to the surrounding ecosystem, this is best done by cutting down the plant. The debris from the invasive species can be piled and used as a home for smaller critters. In Australia, it has been found that invasive species such as Lantana (Lantana camara) can also provide refuge for bird species such as the superb fairywren (Malurus cyaneus) and silvereye (Zosterops lateralis), in the absence of native plant equivalents.

A wildlife garden should be dense enough in native plant species that there is enough ground coverage for species varying in size to find cover (for hiding or shade amongst other things) and shelter. Creating shade is also important in any wildlife garden. Leaf litter, or material that has fallen from a plant on to the ground, creates the perfect mulch and fertilization for a wildlife garden. Leaf litter can soak up excess water from heavy rainfall during the fall and winter time, contain that moisture and slowly release it into surrounding native plants to help them during the spring and summer time. It may also be of help to added native forbs, herbaceous flowering plants, to provide additional food for the wildlife. In the US, some examples of native forbs would be species such as the tapertip hawksbeard (Crepis acuminata), this yellow flowering plant is native and common in the west. The tapertip hawksbeard (Crepis acuminata) is low in abundance and is in need for the sage-grouse species to thrive.

== Complications with wildlife gardens ==
In theory, with proper planning, a wildlife garden can successfully provide habitat for desired wildlife and can attract many pollinators, essentially boosting local species biodiversity. However, a wildlife garden can also become a habitat sink, instead accomplishing the opposite of its intended purpose. Many wildlife gardens will have native vegetation planted due to the benefits it offers to the local fauna, as well as its convenience to humans because of its easy maintenance.

It is important to consider when planning these gardens that if there are no similar native plants neighboring its intended location, the garden may indeed attract desired wildlife, but its visibility may also attract unwanted predators. As the local species population grows due to the newly provided habitat, predators may take advantage of the sudden influx in prey populations, and might show up unexpectedly to strike. In cases such as this, the wildlife garden instead becomes a habitat sink; thus it is important to plan carefully and take precautions, while always expecting the unexpected.

== Benefits of a wildlife garden ==
Beautifying your home or community, the satisfaction of creative effort, the health benefits of spending time outdoors are just some of the benefits of wildlife gardening. Research has found that a positive feedback loop is built as wildlife choose to visit and enjoy the wildlife gardens in people's homes leaving the owners feeling a sense of satisfaction, fulfillment, and affirmation. Living in the city can result in a loss of connection with nature, and reduce the desire to seek this interaction in our daily lives. Having this disconnect with nature can impact the empathy and care we have for other species other than ourselves as we cannot see our impacts on them if we do not interact with them. Wildlife gardening can enhance urban biodiversity as well as connection to nature. If done in large enough proportions, wildlife gardens can form wildlife corridors.

As there continues to be a decline in urban biodiversity it is said that gardening may play a major role in sustaining wildlife.

=== Social and human well-being benefits ===
Wildlife gardeners report that wildlife gardening has provided them with benefits such as a reduction in stress and anxiety, an improvement in overall mental well-being, the act of making social connections, and the sense of accomplishment at the witness of their efforts proving successful once different species begin to interact with their gardens. There are also several known positive effects that come from interacting with nature, resulting in beneficial reactions from the human body. Immediate positive effects are an increased physical activity and mental stimulation from physical labor going into the gardens by humans, but there are positive effects that happen internally within the human body as well.

Some examples include visual or olfactory contact with flora or any kind of nature, which stimulates the parasympathetic nervous system, and an association between an increase in attention in humans who experience plant and animal diversity, implying a reduction in anxiety.

== National Wildlife Habitat Certification ==
The U.S. National Wildlife Federation provides a Certified Wildlife Habitat program that's main goal is to certify homeowners that provide additional habitat for wildlife that reside in urban areas dominated by the human population.

In order to be a part of the program one must first fill out the certification application that the National Wildlife Federation has created. The application form includes a check-list that homeowners must check off when each element is providable to wildlife in their wildlife garden. There are five key components on the check-list: sustainable garden practices (such as being without harmful pesticides or fertilizers and practicing techniques such as composting), sources of food and water, places to take cover/hide, and space to raise potential offspring. It is important as well, when considering types of food to include to consider those from categories such as seeds from flowers or trees, nectar, twigs, fruit such as berries, pollen, and sap.

There are additional specifications for each property depending on size of yard and region/area that the home is in. Homeowners' associations have also been working towards aiding the increase of biodiversity, specifically of plant and bird species, and encouraging participants and other homeowners to do so. Residential wildlife gardens can help strengthen connections between humans and the environment, between both its abiotic and biotic features. Wildlife gardens are very necessary to restoration efforts and with more efforts and collaborate work it can be even more effective as an urban footprint that helps offset the negative environmental effects of urban development. The National Wildlife Federation is also able to go far beyond certifying homeowner's yards but also balconies (in apartments for example), workplaces (near or in the buildings) schools (class gardens or rooftops), farms, along with community gardens.

== In the Netherlands ==
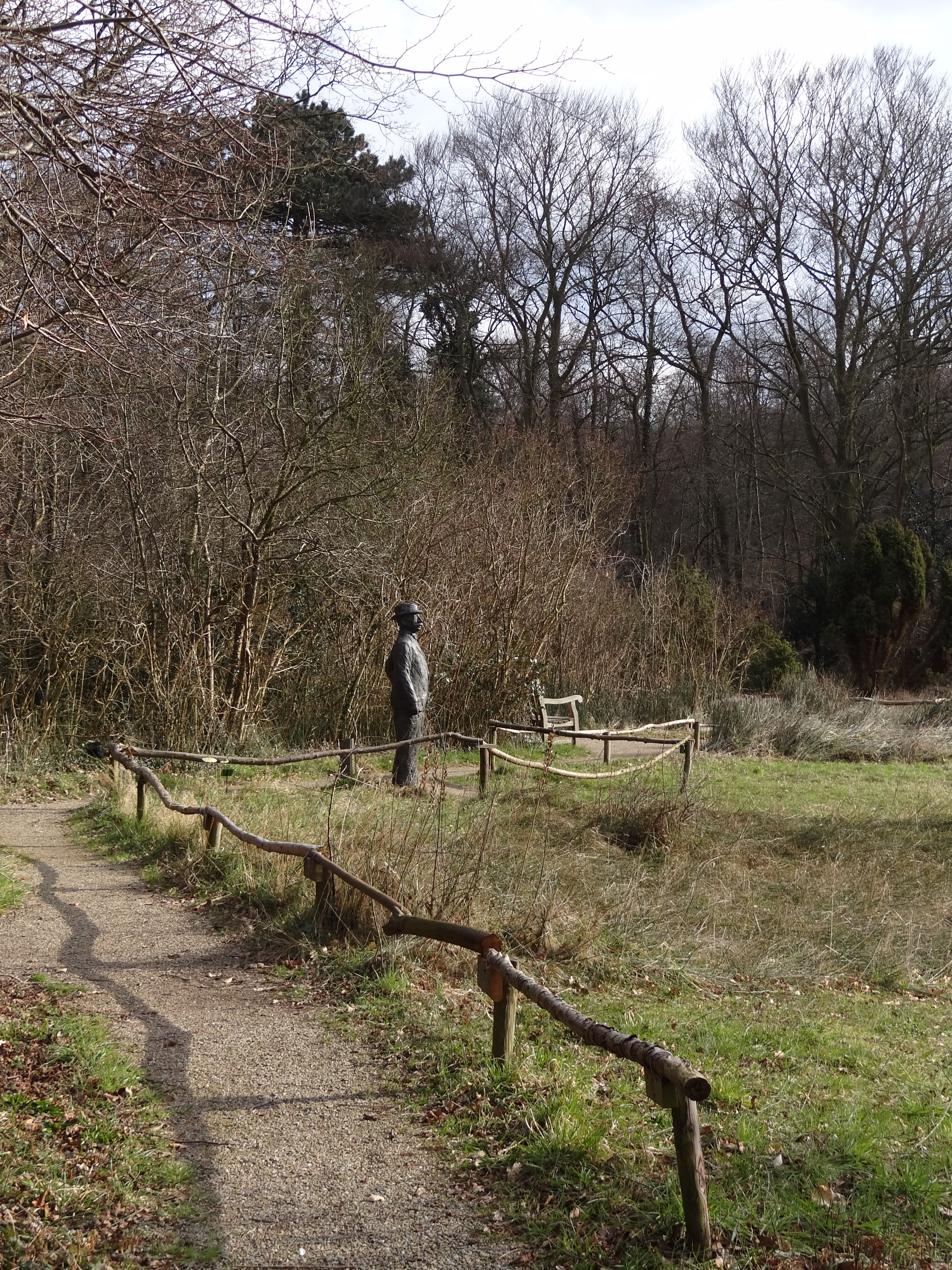
Statue of Jacobus P. Thijsse at Thijsse's Hof wildlife garden

Wildlife gardens in the Netherlands are called "heemtuinen". The first was created in 1925: Thijsse's Hof (Garden of Thijsse) in Bloemendaal, near Haarlem. It was given to Jac. P. Thijsse for his 60th birthday, and still exists today. The garden displays about 800 plants native to the dune region of South Kennemerland, where it is located. It is said to be one of the oldest wildlife gardens of its sort in the world.

Nowadays, some 25 wildlife gardens exist in the Netherlands.

== See also ==
- Backyard Wildlife Habitat
- Butterfly gardening
- Climate-friendly gardening
- List of garden types
- Natural landscaping
- Permaculture
- Pollinator garden
- Reconciliation ecology
- Urban rewilding
- Wilderness (garden history)
