= Pollinator =

Animal that moves pollen from the male anther of a flower to the female stigma

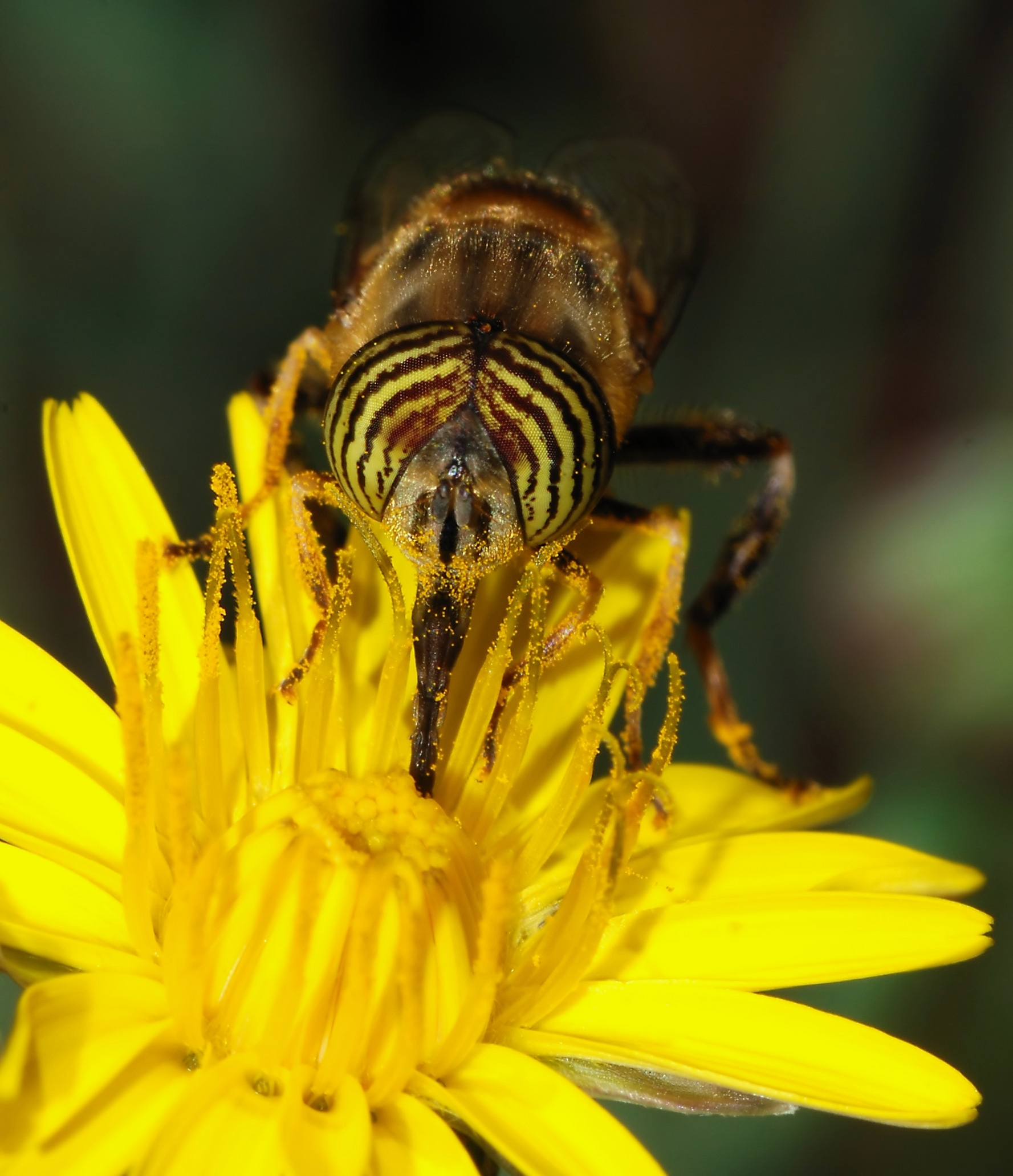
A syrphid fly (Eristalinus taeniops) pollinating a common hawkweed

A mining bee (Andrena lonicerae) pollinating a honeysuckle (Lonicera gracilipes).

A pollinator is an animal that moves pollen from the male anther of a flower to the female stigma of a flower. This helps to bring about fertilization of the ovules in the flower by the male gametes from the pollen grains.

Insects are the major pollinators of most plants, and insect pollinators include all families of bees and most families of aculeate wasps; ants; many families of flies; many lepidopterans (both butterflies and moths); and many families of beetles. Vertebrates, mainly bats and birds, but also some non-bat mammals (monkeys, lemurs, possums, rodents) and some lizards pollinate certain plants. Among the pollinating birds are hummingbirds, honeyeaters and sunbirds with long beaks; they pollinate a number of deep-throated flowers. Humans may also carry out artificial pollination.

A pollinator is different from a pollenizer, a plant that is a source of pollen for the pollination process.

== Background ==
Plants fall into pollination syndromes that reflect the type of pollinator being attracted. These are characteristics such as: overall flower size, the depth and width of the corolla, the color (including patterns called nectar guides that are visible only in ultraviolet light), the scent, amount of nectar, composition of nectar, etc. For example, birds visit red flowers with long, narrow tubes and much nectar, but are not as strongly attracted to wide flowers with little nectar and copious pollen, which are more attractive to beetles. When these characteristics are experimentally modified (altering colour, size, orientation), pollinator visitation may decline.

Although non-bee pollinators have been seen to be less effective at depositing pollen than bee pollinators one study showed that non-bees made more visits than bees resulting in non-bees performing 38% of visits to crop flowers, outweighing the ineffectiveness of their ability to pollinate.

It has recently been discovered that cycads, which are not flowering plants, are also pollinated by insects. In 2016, researchers showed evidence of pollination occurring underwater, which was previously thought not to happen.

== Types of pollinators ==
=== Insects ===
==== Bees ====
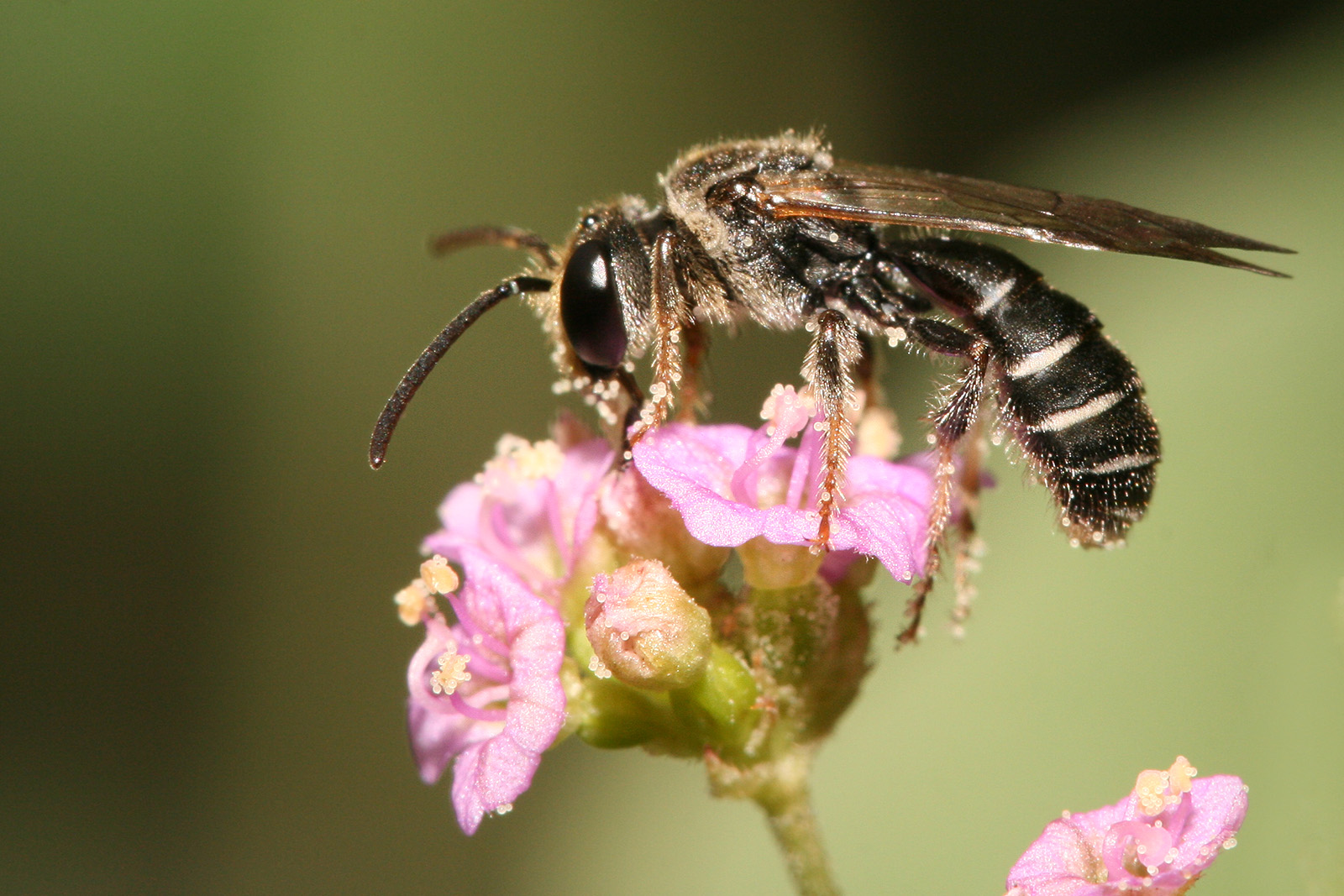
Lipotriches sp. bee pollinating flowers

The most recognized pollinators are the various species of bees, which are plainly adapted to pollination. Bees typically are fuzzy and carry an electrostatic charge. Both features help pollen grains adhere to their bodies, but they also have specialized pollen-carrying structures; in most bees, this takes the form of a structure known as the scopa, which is on the hind legs of most bees, and/or the lower abdomen (e.g., of megachilid bees), made up of thick, plumose setae. Honey bees, bumblebees, and their relatives do not have a scopa, but the hind leg is modified into a structure called the corbicula (also known as the "pollen basket"). Most bees gather nectar, a concentrated energy source, and pollen, which is high protein food, to nurture their young, and transfer some among the flowers as they are working. Euglossine bees pollinate orchids, but these are male bees collecting floral scents rather than females gathering nectar or pollen. Female orchid bees act as pollinators, but of flowers other than orchids. Eusocial bees such as honey bees need an abundant and steady pollen source to multiply.

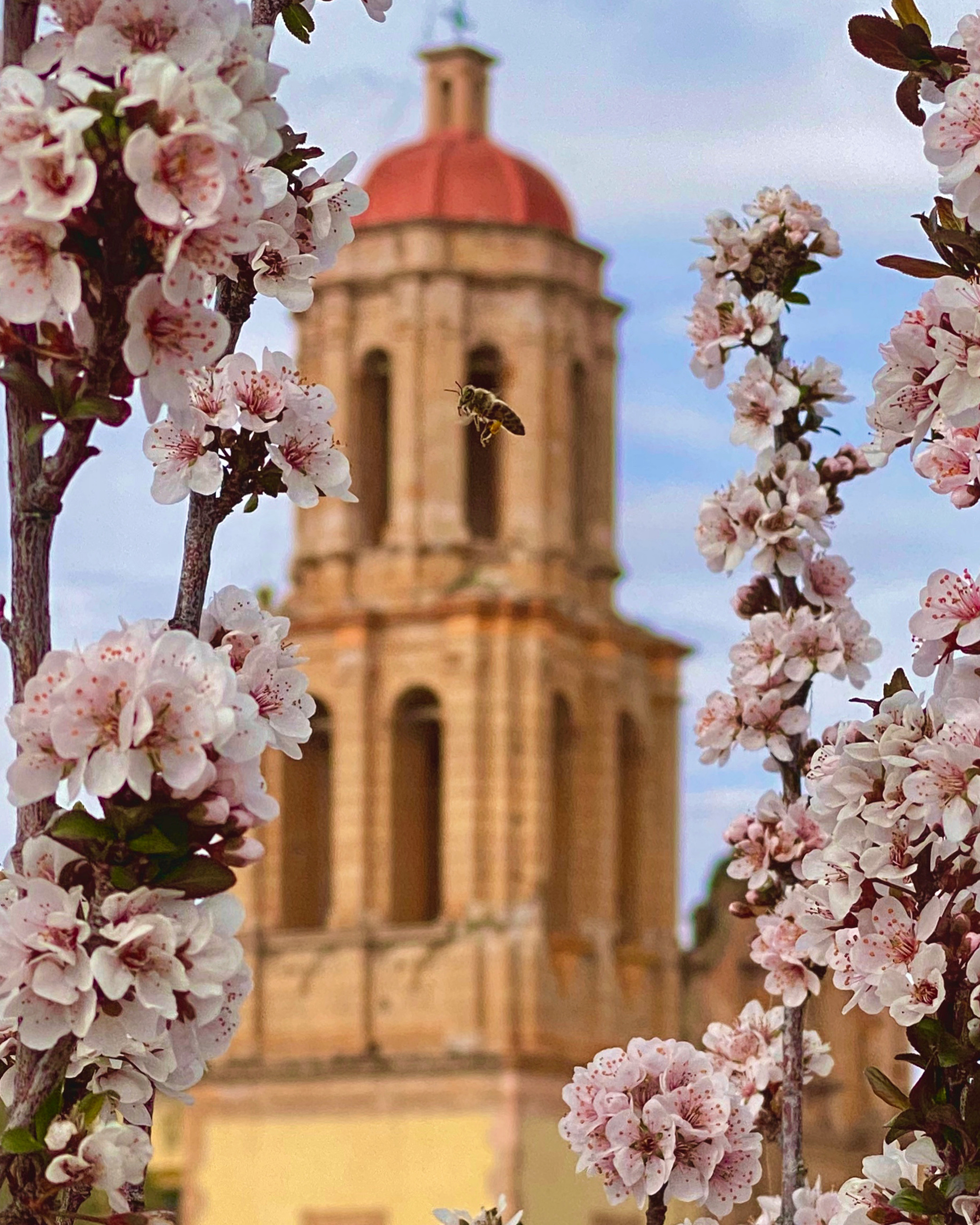
Honey bee pollinating a plum tree. Bees are the most effective insect pollinators.

Honey bees travel from flower to flower, collecting nectar (later converted to honey), and pollen grains. The bee collects the pollen by rubbing against the anthers. The pollen collects on the hind legs, in a structure referred to as a "pollen basket". As the bee flies from flower to flower, some of the pollen grains are transferred onto the stigma of other flowers. Nectar provides the energy for bee nutrition; pollen provides the protein. When bees are rearing large quantities of brood (beekeepers say hives are "building"), bees deliberately gather pollen to meet the nutritional needs of the brood.

Good pollination management seeks to have bees in a "building" state during the bloom period of the crop, thus requiring them to gather pollen, and making them more efficient pollinators. Thus, the management techniques of a beekeeper providing pollination services are different from, and to some extent in tension with, those of a beekeeper who is trying to produce honey. Millions of hives of honey bees are contracted out as pollinators by beekeepers, and honey bees are by far the most important commercial pollinating agents, but many other kinds of pollinators, from blue bottle flies, to bumblebees, orchard mason bees, and leaf cutter bees are cultured and sold for managed pollination.

Other species of bees differ in various details of their behavior and pollen-gathering habits, and honey bees are not native to the Western Hemisphere; all pollination of native plants in the Americas and Australia historically has been performed by various native bees. It has also been found that non-native plants may have positive effects on native bee pollinators while also influencing their foraging patterns and bee–plant networks.

==== Butterflies and moths ====
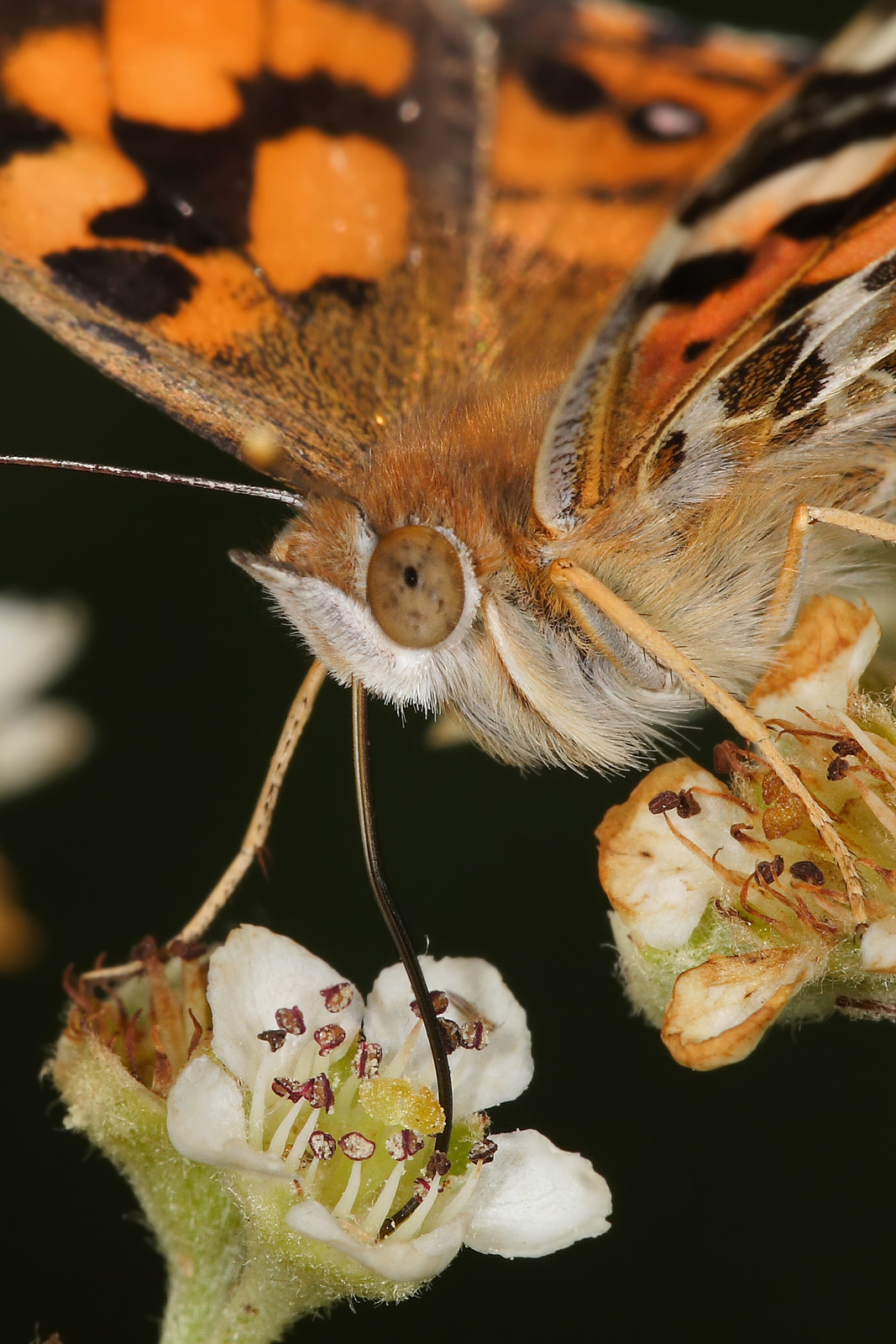
An Australian painted lady feeding on nectar

Lepidoptera (butterflies and moths) may also pollinate to various degrees. They are not major pollinators of food crops, but various moths are important pollinators of other commercial crops such as tobacco. Pollination by certain moths may be important, however, or even crucial, for some wildflowers mutually adapted to specialist pollinators. Spectacular examples include orchids such as Angraecum sesquipedale, dependent on a particular hawk moth, Morgan's sphinx. Yucca species provide other examples, being fertilised in elaborate ecological interactions with particular species of yucca moths.

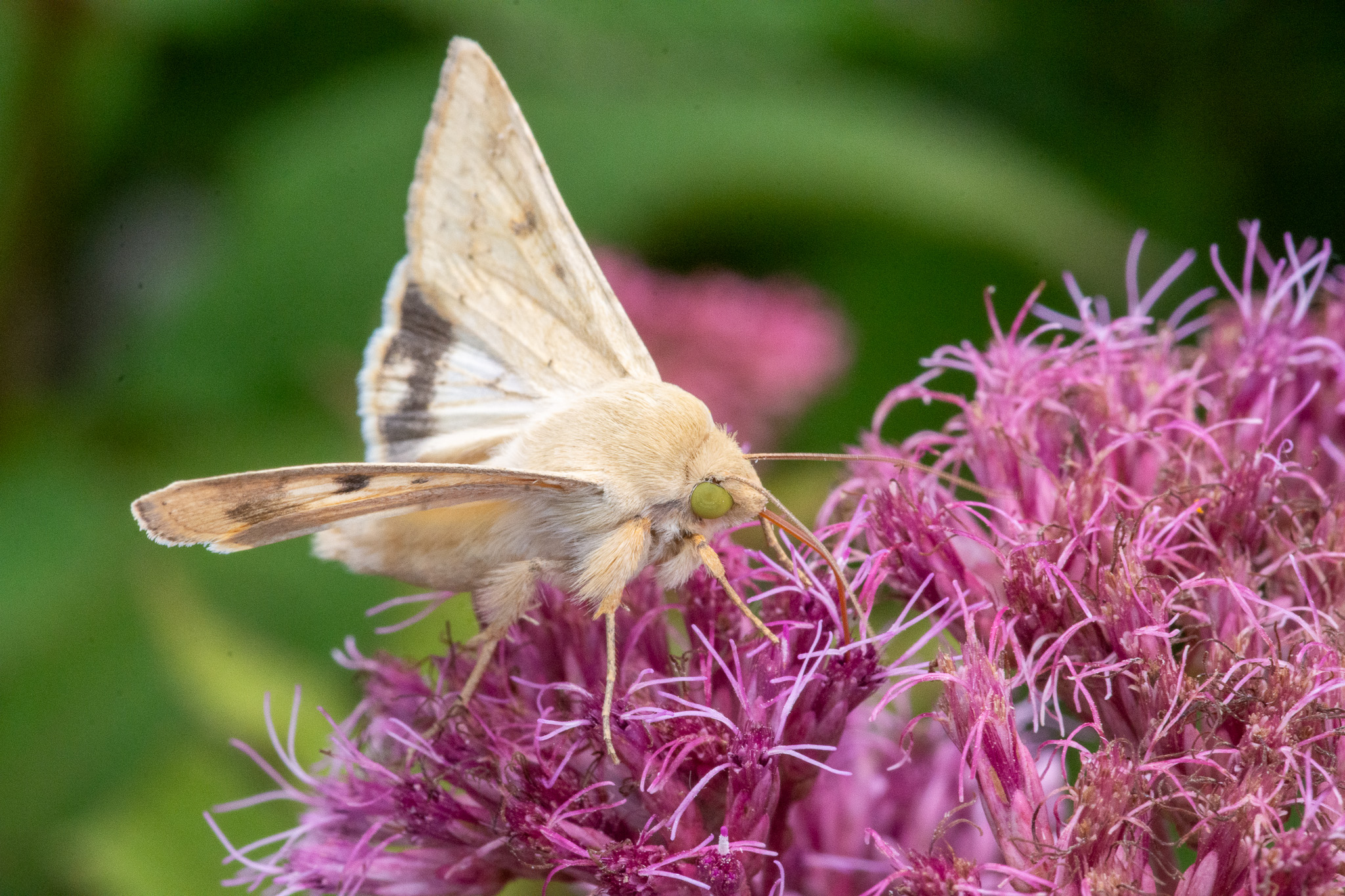
Helicoverpa zea feeding on nectar of Eutrochium

==== Flies ====
Many bee flies, and some Tabanidae and Nemestrinidae are particularly adapted to pollinating fynbos and Karoo plants with narrow, deep corolla tubes, such as Lapeirousia species. Part of the adaptation takes the form of remarkably long probosces. This also applies to empidine dance flies (Empidinae) that visit a wide range of flowering plants, some species of which can pollinate the woodland geranium (Geranium sylvaticum L.) as effectively as bees.

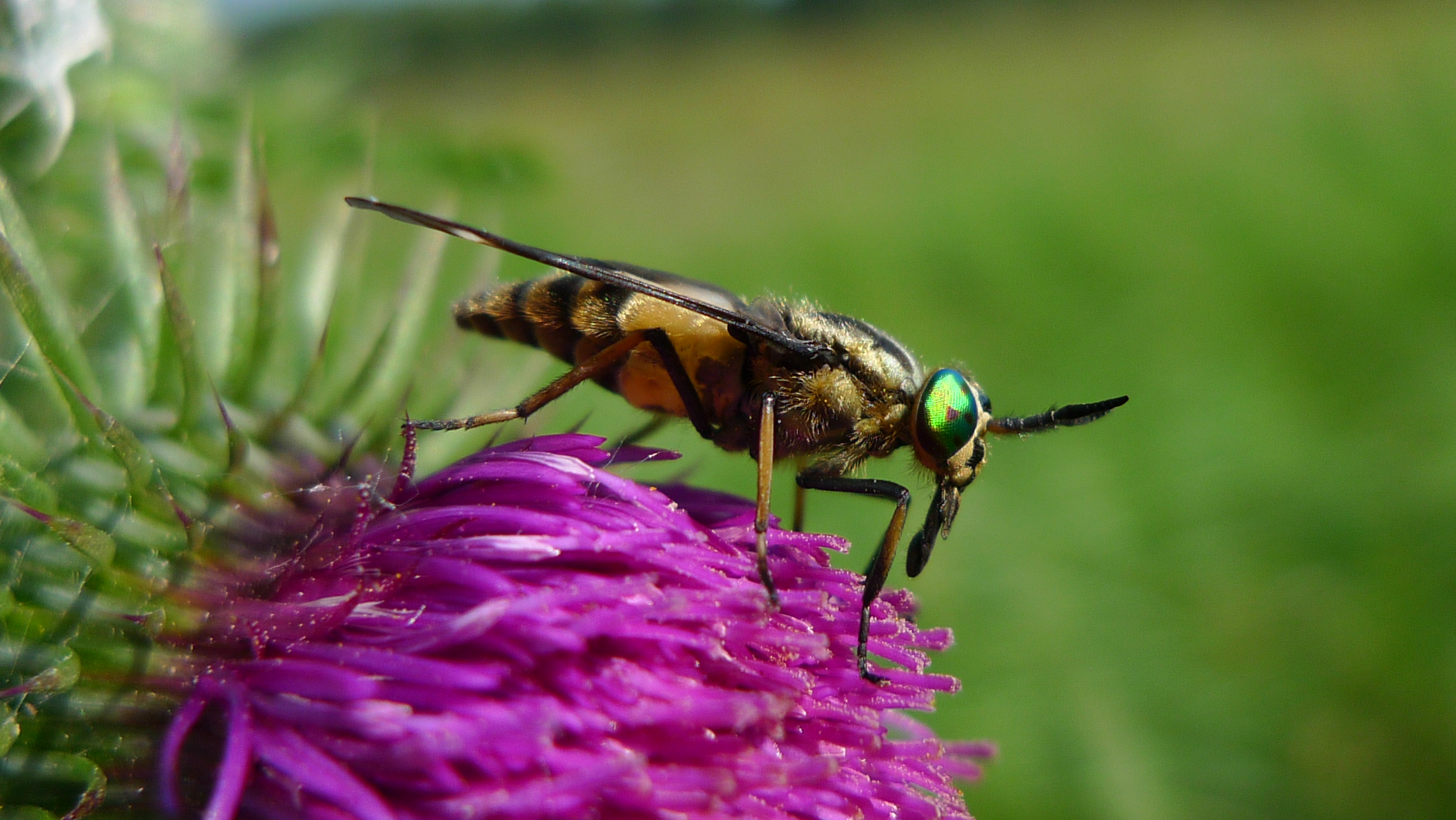
Tabanid fly on a thistle flower

Carrion flies and flesh flies in families such as Calliphoridae and Sarcophagidae are important for some species of plants whose flowers exude a fetid odor. The plants' ecological strategy varies; several species of Stapelia, for example, attract carrion flies that futilely lay their eggs on the flower, where their larvae promptly starve for lack of carrion. Other species do decay rapidly after ripening, and offer the visiting insects large masses of food, as well as pollen and sometimes seed to carry off when they leave.

Hoverflies are important pollinators of flowering plants worldwide. Often hoverflies are considered to be the second most important pollinators after wild bees. Although hoverflies as a whole are generally considered to be nonselective pollinators, some species have more specialized relationships. The orchid species Epipactis veratrifolia mimics alarm pheromones of aphids to attract hover flies for pollination. Another plant, the slipper orchid in southwest China, also achieves pollination by deceit by exploiting the innate yellow colour preference of syrphids.

Some male dacine fruit flies are exclusive pollinators of some wild Bulbophyllum orchids that lack nectar and have a specific chemical attractant and reward (methyl eugenol, raspberry ketone or zingerone) present in their floral fragrances.

Some flies, especially Anthomyiidae, Empididae and Muscidae, may be the main pollinators at higher elevations of mountains, whereas bumblebee species are typically the only other pollinators in alpine regions at timberline and beyond.

Some adult mosquitoes, if they feed on nectar, may act as pollinators; Aedes communis, a species found in North America, is known to pollinate Platanthera obtusata, commonly referred as the blunt-leaved orchid.

Biting midges (Ceratopogonidae) pollinate Theobroma cacao (Malvaceae), whose flowers have pollen inaccessible to larger pollinators.

==== Other insects ====
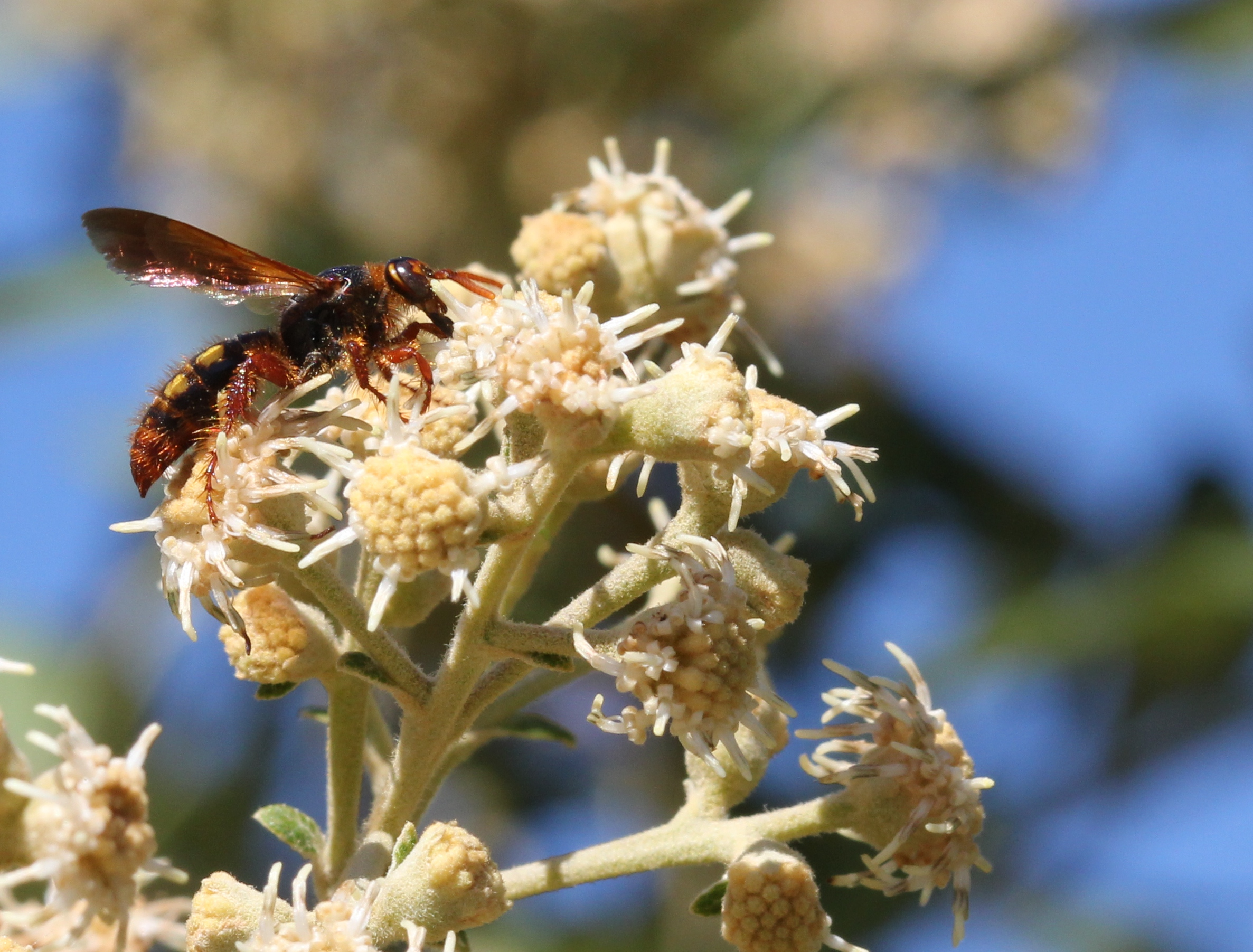
A Scoliid wasp (Scolia chrysotricha) foraging

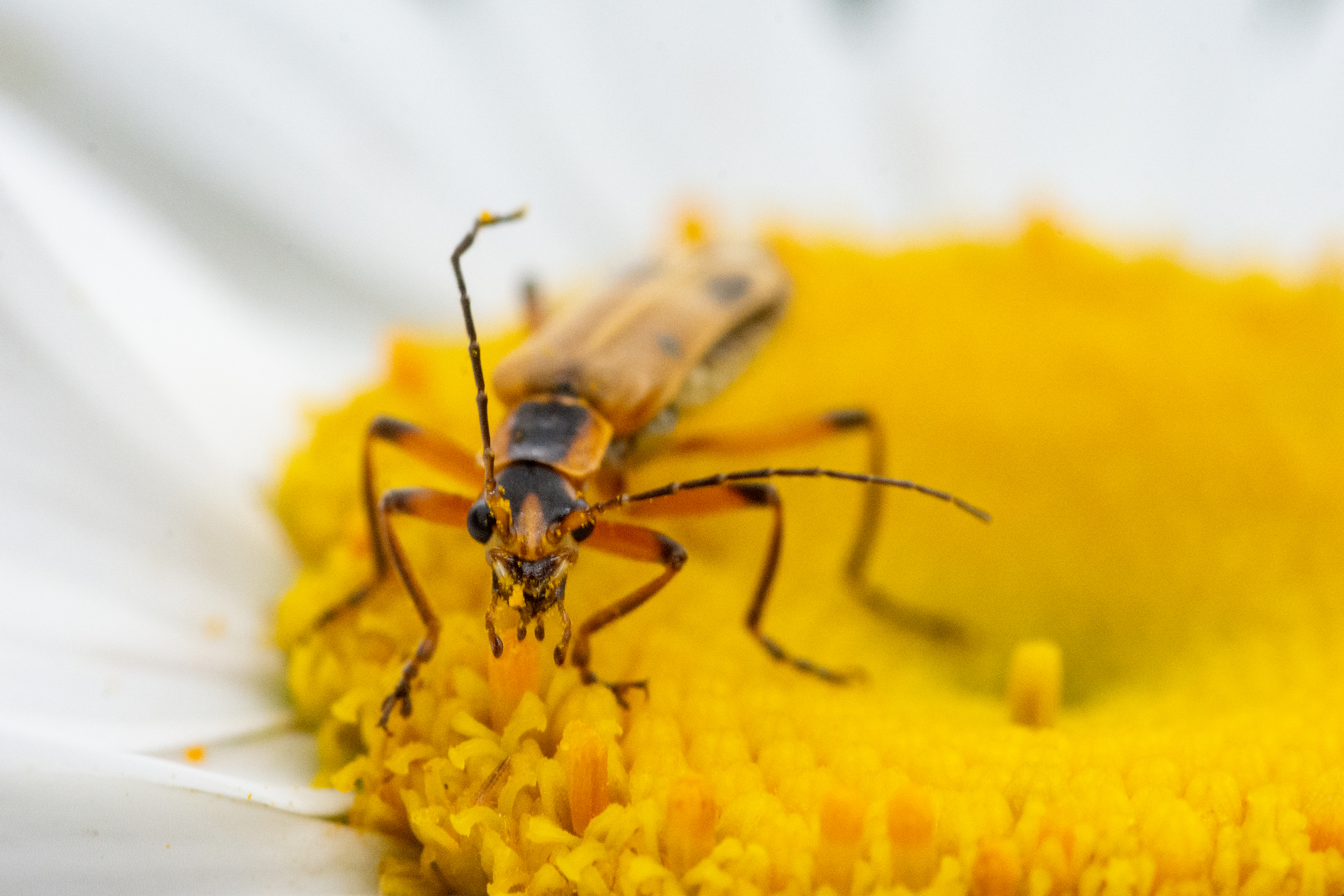
Non-flying insects such as Soldier beetles are pollinators as well as predators of common garden "pests" such as Aphids

Many insects other than bees accomplish pollination by visiting flowers for nectar or pollen, or commonly both. Many do so adventitiously, but the most important pollinators are specialists for at least parts of their life cycles for at least certain functions.

Prominent among Hymenoptera other than bees are wasps, especially Crabronidae, Chrysididae, Ichneumonidae, Sphecidae and Vespidae. Some wasps are comparable to or even superior to some bees as pollinators. The term "pollen wasps", in particular, is widely applied to the Masarinae, a subfamily of the Vespidae; they are remarkable among solitary wasps in that they specialise in gathering pollen for feeding their larvae, carried internally and regurgitated into a mud chamber prior to oviposition. Also, males of many species of bees and wasps, though they do not gather pollen, rely on flowers as sources of energy (in the form of nectar) and also as territories for meeting fertile females that visit the flowers.

Beetles of species that specialise in eating pollen, nectar, or flowers themselves, may be important cross-pollinators of some plants such as members of the Araceae and Zamiaceae, that produce prodigious amounts of pollen. Others, for example the Hopliini, specialise on flowers of Asteraceae and Aizoaceae.

Thrips pollinate plants such as elderflower Sambucus nigra (Adoxaceae) and pointleaf manzanita, Arctostaphylos pungens (Ericaceae). Ants also pollinate some kinds of flowers, but for the most part they are parasites, consuming nectar and/or pollen without conveying useful amounts of pollen to a stigma. Other insect orders are rarely pollinators, and then typically only incidentally (e.g., Hemiptera such as Anthocoridae and Miridae).

A strategy of great biological interest is that of sexual deception, where plants, generally orchids, produce remarkably complex combinations of pheromonal attractants and physical mimicry induce male bees or wasps to attempt to mate with them, conveying pollinia in the process. Examples are known from all continents apart from Antarctica, though Australia appears to be exceptionally rich in examples.

Whole groups of plants, such as certain fynbos Moraea and Erica species produce flowers on sticky peduncles or with sticky corolla tubes that only permit access to flying pollinators, whether bird, bat, or insect.

=== Other invertebrates ===
Experimental evidence has shown invertebrates (mostly small crustaceans) acting as pollinators in underwater environments. Beds of seagrass have been shown to reproduce this way in the absence of currents. It is not yet known how important invertebrate pollinators might be for other species. Later, Idotea balthica was discovered to help Gracilaria gracilis reproduce – the first known case of an animal helping algae reproduce.

=== Vertebrates ===
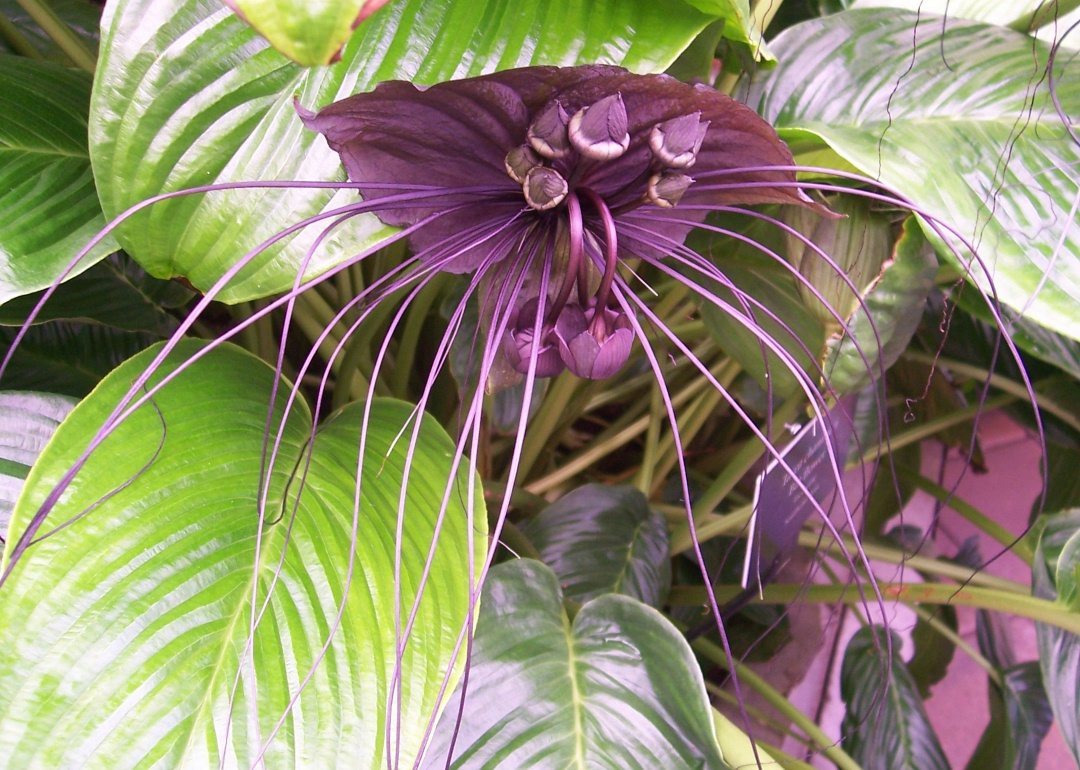
Tropical flowers like Tacca chantrieri are bat-pollinated.

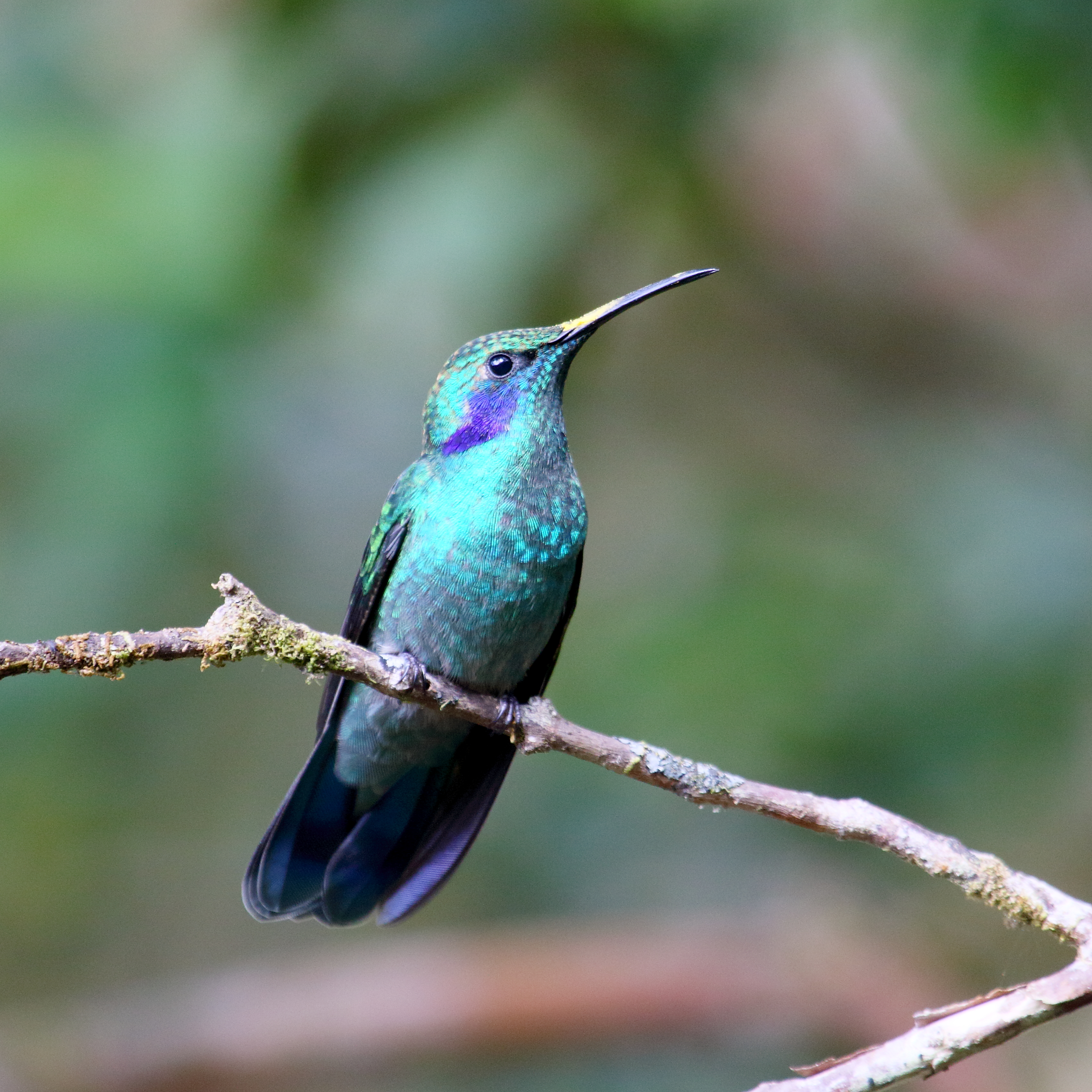
Green violetear with pollen on bill, Curi Cancha Wildlife Refuge, Costa Rica

Bats are important pollinators of some tropical flowers, visiting to take nectar. Birds, particularly hummingbirds, honeyeaters and sunbirds also accomplish much pollination, especially of deep-throated flowers. Other vertebrates, such as kinkajous, monkeys, lemurs, possums, rodents, lizards, and canids have been recorded pollinating some plants.

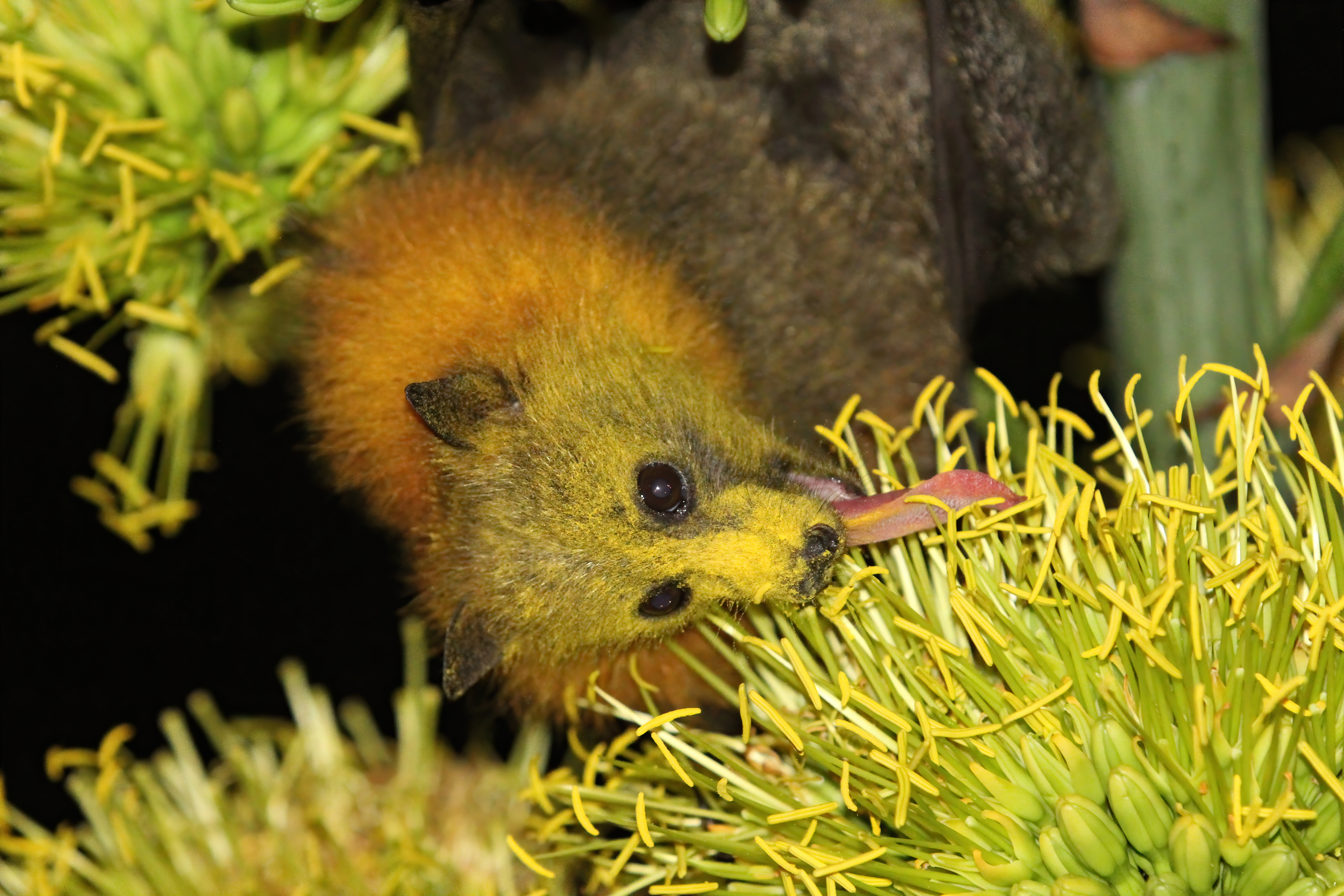
A Grey-headed Flying Fox eating nectar while being covered in yellow pollen

Humans can be pollinators, as many gardeners have discovered that they must hand pollinate garden vegetables, whether because of pollinator decline or simply to keep a strain genetically pure. This can involve using a small brush or cotton swab to move pollen, or to simply tap or shake tomato blossoms to release the pollen for the self-pollinating flowers. Tomato blossoms are self-fertile, but (with the exception of potato-leaf varieties) have the pollen inside the anther, and the flower requires shaking to release the pollen through pores. This can be done by wind, by humans, or by a sonicating bee (one that vibrates its wing muscles while perched on the flower), such as a bumblebee. Sonicating bees are extremely efficient pollinators of tomatoes, and colonies of bumblebees are quickly replacing humans as the primary pollinators for greenhouse tomatoes.

== Floral and non-floral resources ==
Pollinators require a variety of resources. Most native bees in North America are solitary, ground-nesting species that collect a variety of natural resources including pollen, nectar, leaves, petals and resins to be used as sources of food, supplies for their larva, or nest linings. Floral diet diversity has been seen to increase immunocompetence levels in honeybees (Apis mellifera) where diets that consisted of a wide variety of flowering species induced higher glucose oxidase activity, which honeybees' produce to sterilize their colony.

The Royal Horticultural Society in the UK has identified more than 10,000 plants which are beneficial for pollinators, following a review reported in 2025 of an earlier list. The list consists of hardy, non-invasive plants which are available to gardeners and for which there is published evidence of either regular pollinator use or occasional visits of proven value such as nectar yield or off-season flowering patterns.

More than 30% of global bee species depend on non-floral resources for nest building, protection, health, pest resistance, and alternative food sources. Non-floral resources include leaves, soil, plant resins and secretions, and are often provided by woody-vegetation.

== Pollinator population declines and conservation ==
Pollinators provide a key ecosystem service vital to the maintenance of both wild and agricultural plant communities. In 1999 the Convention on Biological Diversity issued the São Paulo Declaration on Pollinators, recognizing the critical role that these species play in supporting and maintaining terrestrial productivity as well as the survival challenges they face due to anthropogenic change. Today pollinators are considered to be in a state of decline; some species, such as Franklin's bumble bee (Bombus franklini) have been red-listed and are in danger of extinction. Although managed bee hives are increasing worldwide, these can not compensate for the loss of wild pollinators in many locations.

A 2017 report done for the Center of Biological Diversity utilized data documented in the United States on native bee species and found that nearly 1 in 4 (347 species of 1,437 species) is imperiled and at increasing risk of extinction. More than half of the native bee species is in decline and 40% of global insect pollinators (primarily native bees) are highly threatened.

Declines in the health and population of pollinators pose what could be a significant threat to the integrity of biodiversity, to global food webs, and to human health. At least 80% of our world's crop species require pollination to set seed. A 2021 study estimated that without pollinators, fertility would be reduced by 80% in half all wild plant species and one-third of all wild plant species would fail to produce any seeds at all.

An estimated one out of every three bites of food comes to us through the work of animal pollinators. The quality of pollinator service has declined over time and this had led to concerns that pollination will be less resistant to extinction in the future.

A 2022 study concludes that the decline of pollinator populations is responsible for 500,000 early human deaths per year by reducing the supply of healthy foods. A decline of pollinators has caused 3–5% loss of fruits, vegetables and nuts. Lower consumption of these healthy foods translates to 1% of all deaths, according to the authors.

=== Pesticide usage ===
Neonicotinoids (Neonics) are a class of synthetic insecticides that are the most widely applied pesticides today due to its water solubility and ability to treat a wide variety of pests. Neonics are highly environmentally persistent, and may contaminate terrestrial and aquatic habitats for as much as six years. Exposed honeybees' (Apis mellifera) have been seen to have lower reproductive output, reduction in nest building or failed to build nests, reduced foraging abilities, and weakened immunity.

=== Strategy ===
Researchers are still trying to determine how to scientifically best restore and maintain the diverse pollinator habitats found around the world. Many studies conclude that restoration and conservation are key to maintaining biodiversity and pollinator populations. According to the Kansas National Park Service, native tallgrass prairie was widespread through North America and home to over 300 species of flowering plants. This habitat is crucial to wild pollinators and now only covers 4% of its original 170-million acre range. By restoring wild pollinators' natural habitat and maintaining Earth's biodiversity, populations are assumed to increase. In recent times, environmental groups have put pressure on the Environmental Protection Agency to ban neonicotinoids, a type of insecticide.

On 20 June 2014, President Barack Obama issued a presidential memorandum entitled "Creating a Federal Strategy to Promote the Health of Honey Bees and Other Pollinators". The President's memorandum established a Pollinator Health Task Force, to be co-chaired by the Secretary of Agriculture and the Administrator of the Environmental Protection Agency. The memorandum stated:

Pollinators contribute substantially to the economy of the United States and are vital to keeping fruits, nuts, and vegetables in our diets. Honey bee pollination alone adds more than $15 billion in value to agricultural crops each year in the United States. Over the past few decades, there has been a significant loss of pollinators, including honey bees, native bees, birds, bats, and butterflies, from the environment. The problem is serious and requires immediate attention to ensure the sustainability of our food production systems, avoid additional economic impact on the agricultural sector, and protect the health of the environment.

Pollinator losses have been severe. The number of migrating Monarch butterflies sank to the lowest recorded population level in 2013-14, and there is an imminent risk of failed migration. The continued loss of commercial honey bee colonies poses a threat to the economic stability of commercial beekeeping and pollination operations in the United States, which could have profound implications for agriculture and food. Severe yearly declines create concern that bee colony losses could reach a point from which the commercial pollination industry would not be able to adequately recover. The loss of native bees, which also play a key role in pollination of crops, is much less studied, but many native bee species are believed to be in decline. Scientists believe that bee losses are likely caused by a combination of stressors, including poor bee nutrition, loss of forage lands, parasites, pathogens, lack of genetic diversity, and exposure to pesticides.

In May 2015, the Pollinator Health Task Force issued a "National Strategy to Promote the Health of Honey Bees and Other Pollinators". The national strategy outlined a comprehensive approach to tackling and reducing the impact of multiple stressors on pollinator health, including pests and pathogens, reduced habitat, lack of nutritional resources, and exposure to pesticides.

The national strategy laid out federal actions to achieve three goals:

- Honey Bees: Reduce honey bee colony losses during winter (overwintering mortality) to no more than 15% within 10 years.
- Monarch Butterflies: Increase the Eastern population of the monarch butterfly to 225 million butterflies occupying an area of approximately 15 acres (6 hectares) in the overwintering grounds in Mexico, through domestic/international actions and public-private partnerships, by 2020.
- Pollinator Habitat Acreage: Restore or enhance 7 million acres of land for pollinators over the next 5 years through Federal actions and public/private partnerships.

Many of the priority projects that the national strategy identified focused on the I-35 corridor, which extends for 1,500 miles (2,400 km) from Texas to Minnesota. The area through which that highway travels provides spring and summer breeding habitats in the United States' key monarch migration corridor.

The Pollinator Health Task Force simultaneously issued a "Pollinator Research Action Plan". The Plan outlined five main action areas, covered in ten subject-specific chapters. The action areas were: (1) Setting a Baseline; (2) Assessing Environmental Stressors; (3) Restoring Habitat; (4) Understanding and Supporting Stakeholders; (5) Curating and Sharing Knowledge.

In June 2016, the Task Force issued a "Pollinator Partnership Action Plan". That Plan provided examples of past, ongoing, and possible future collaborations between the federal government and non-federal institutions to support pollinator health under each of the national strategy's goals.

==== North America ====
The North American Pollinator Protection Campaign (NAPPC) aims to promote pollinator health across the North America and has organized annual conferences since 1997, creates task forces to implement specific objectives that includes public education and policy research, and is developing strategic plans for conservation that looks to establish partnership between government entities. 11 pollinator-protection agreements have been signed between NAPPC and federal government agencies, responsible for more than 1.5 billion acres of land protections and management.

==== Europe ====
Along with the European Green Deal, which contains initiatives that support pollinator populations, the European Union has implemented the EU Biodiversity Strategy for 2030 which includes the EU Pollinators Initiative that sets long-term objectives to reverse pollinator decline in diversity and numbers by 2030. This initiative includes: (1) improving knowledge of pollinator decline, its causes and consequences; (2) tackling the causes of pollinator decline; and (3) raising awareness, engaging society-at-large and promoting collaboration.

==== South America ====
The Healthy Hives Latin America 2020 (Salud Apícola 2020 Latinoamérica) program is a collaboration between the Bayer Bee Care Center and the Fraunhofer Chile Research Foundation, that works alongside local researchers at universities and beekeepers' associations. The program focuses on increasing the number of healthy worker bees and their colonies by monitoring honey bee health and the contributing factors. This includes educating beekeepers and research collaborations to jointly work on honey bee health. Founded in 2015 with a preliminary project in Chile, the program has expanded to Colombia, Argentina, and Costa Rica.

==== Global ====
The 'Coalition of the Willing on Pollinators' (Promote Pollinators) was initiated in 2016 during the Convention on Biological Diversity's Conference of the Parties (CBD COP13) and is a growing alliance of countries and observers who support the notion that country-led politics can lead to policy measures and innovative action to protect pollinators'. Their supporters are growing steadily, in which 30 countries currently participate.

== Structure of plant-pollinator networks ==
Wild pollinators often visit many plant species and plants are visited by many pollinator species. All these relations together form a network of interactions between plants and pollinators. Surprising similarities were found in the structure of networks consisting out of the interactions between plants and pollinators. This structure was found to be similar in very different ecosystems on different continents, consisting of entirely different species.

The structure of plant-pollinator networks may have large consequences for the way in which pollinator communities respond to increasingly harsh conditions. Mathematical models, examining the consequences of this network structure for the stability of pollinator communities suggest that the specific way in which plant-pollinator networks are organized minimizes competition between pollinators and may even lead to strong indirect facilitation between pollinators when conditions are harsh. This allows pollinator species to survive together under harsh conditions. But it also means that pollinator species collapse simultaneously when conditions pass a critical point. This simultaneous collapse occurs, because pollinator species depend on each other when surviving under difficult conditions.

Such a community-wide collapse, involving many pollinator species, can occur suddenly when increasingly harsh conditions pass a critical point and recovery from such a collapse might not be easy. The improvement in conditions needed for pollinators to recover, could be substantially larger than the improvement needed to return to conditions at which the pollinator community collapsed.

== See also ==
- Agrivoltaics
- Self-pollination
- Pollinator Partnership
- Pollinator Pathway - US nonprofit organization focused on pollinator conservation
- The Pollinator Pathway - wildlife corridor for pollinators in Seattle, Washington
- Pollinator-mediated selection
- Polli:Nation
- Xerces Society

== Bibliography ==
- Sprengel CK (1793). Das entdeckte Geheimnis der Natur im Bau und in der Befruchtung der Blumen [The discovered secret of nature in the construction and fertilization of flowers] (in German). Berlin.
- Fægri K, van der Pijl L (1979). The Principles of Pollination Ecology. New York: Pergamon Press.
- Percival MS (1965). Floral Biology. New York: Pergamon Press.
- Real L (1983). Pollination Biology. New York: Academic Press.
- Bascompte J, Jordano P, Melián CJ, Olesen JM (August 2003). "The nested assembly of plant-animal mutualistic networks". Proceedings of the National Academy of Sciences of the United States of America. 100 (16): 9383–7. Bibcode:2003PNAS..100.9383B. doi:10.1073/pnas.1633576100. PMC 170927. PMID 12881488.
- Bastolla U, Fortuna MA, Pascual-García A, Ferrera A, Luque B, Bascompte J (April 2009). "The architecture of mutualistic networks minimizes competition and increases biodiversity". Nature. 458 (7241): 1018–20. Bibcode:2009Natur.458.1018B. doi:10.1038/nature07950. PMID 19396144. S2CID 4395634.
- Lever JJ, van Nes EH, Scheffer M, Bascompte J (March 2014). "The sudden collapse of pollinator communities". Ecology Letters. 17 (3): 350–9. Bibcode:2014EcolL..17..350L. doi:10.1111/ele.12236. hdl:10261/91808. PMID 24386999.
