= Pollinator garden =

Type of garden

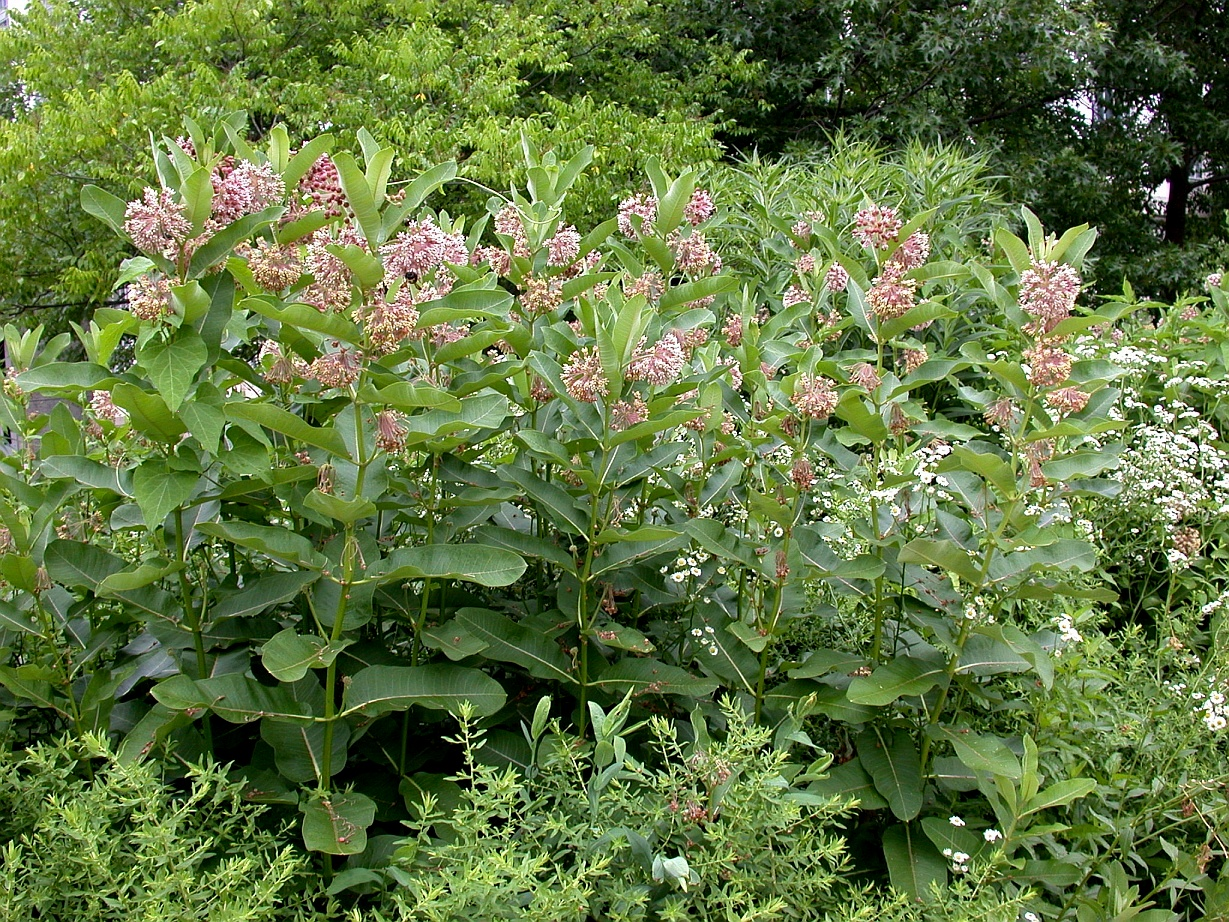
Milkweed in the Smithsonian Pollinator Garden, Washington, D.C.

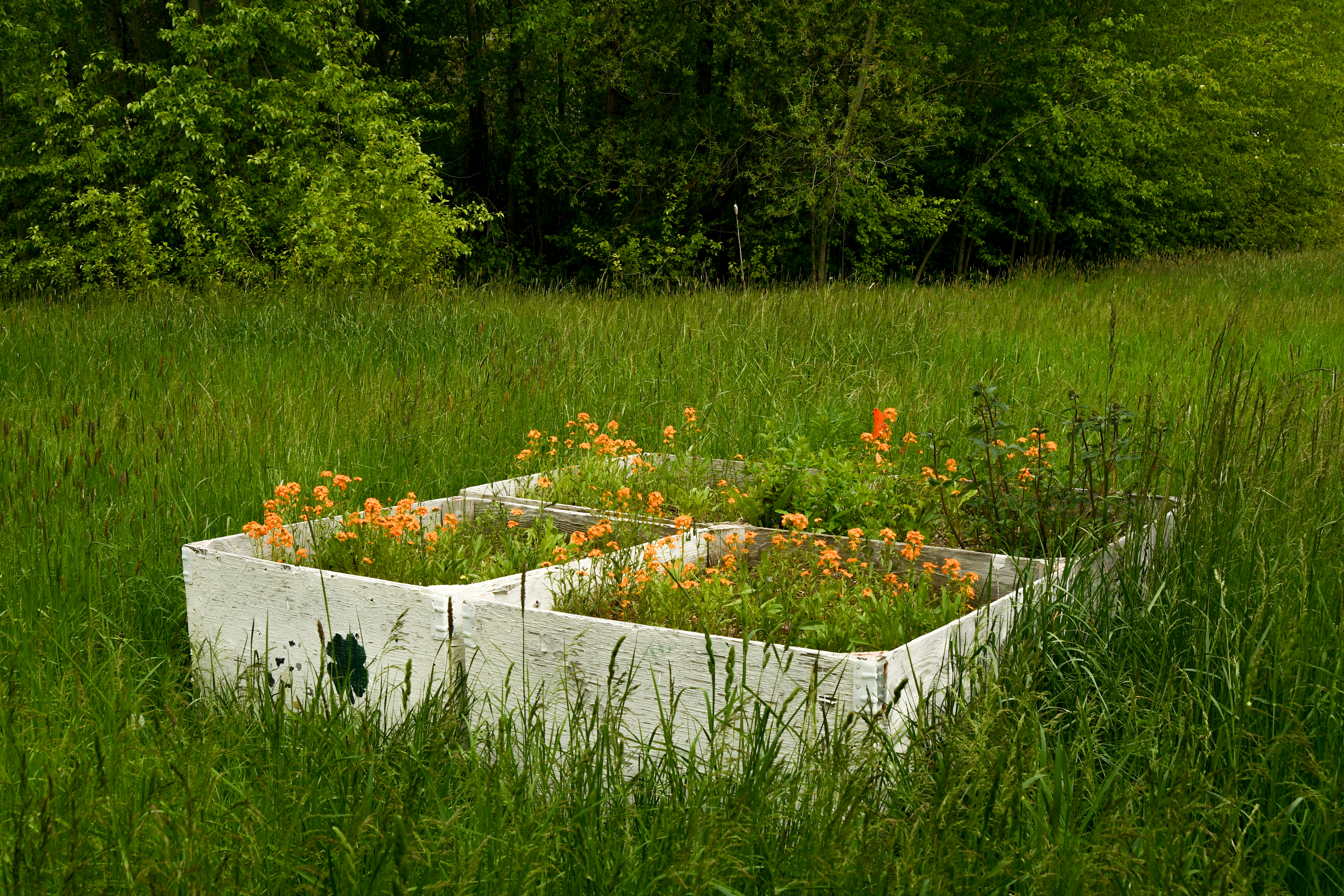
Hood River Valley Public Pollinator Garden, Oregon

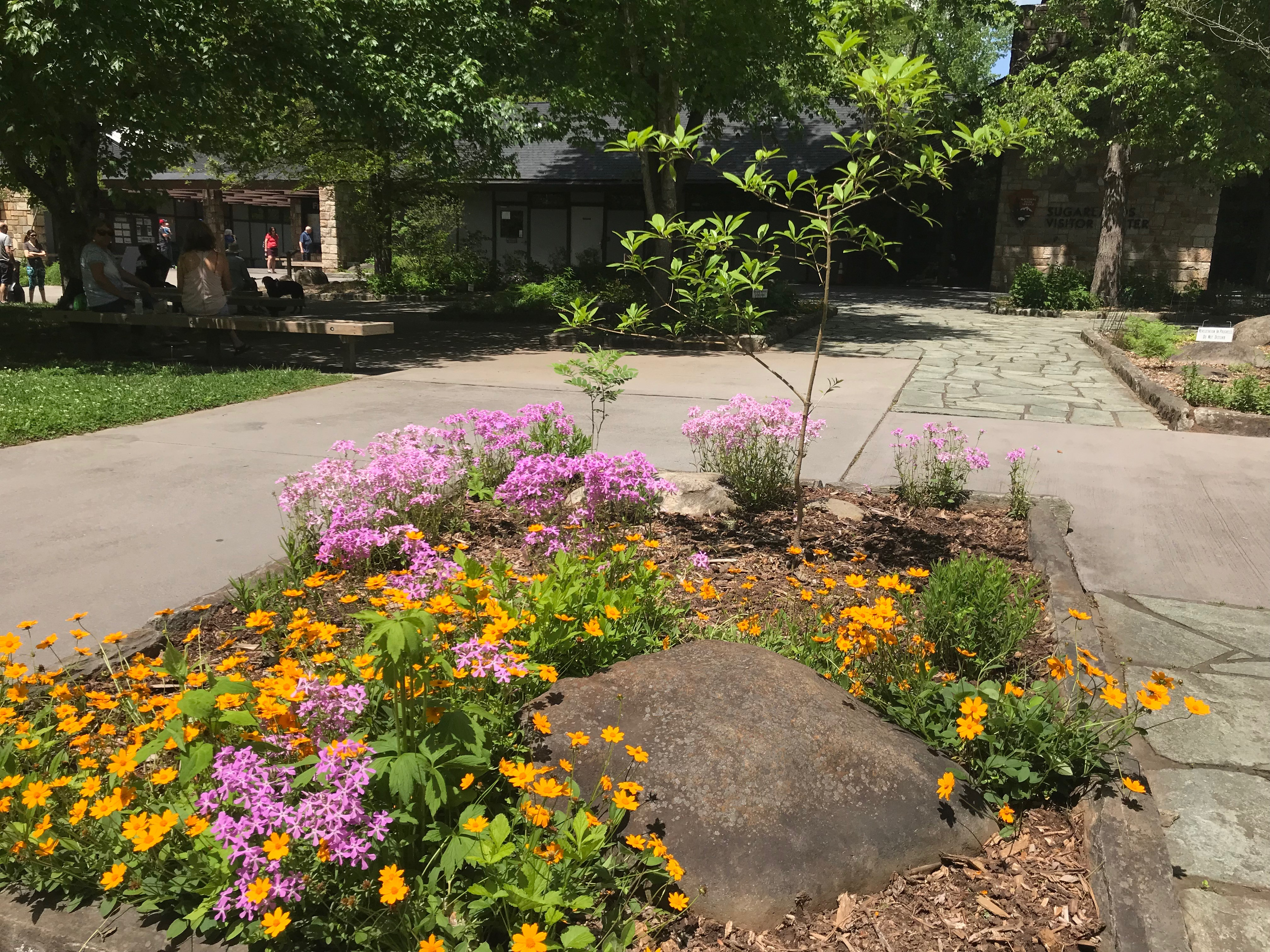
Sugarlands Visitor Center Pollinator Garden in Great Smoky Mountains National Park, Gatlinburg, Tennessee

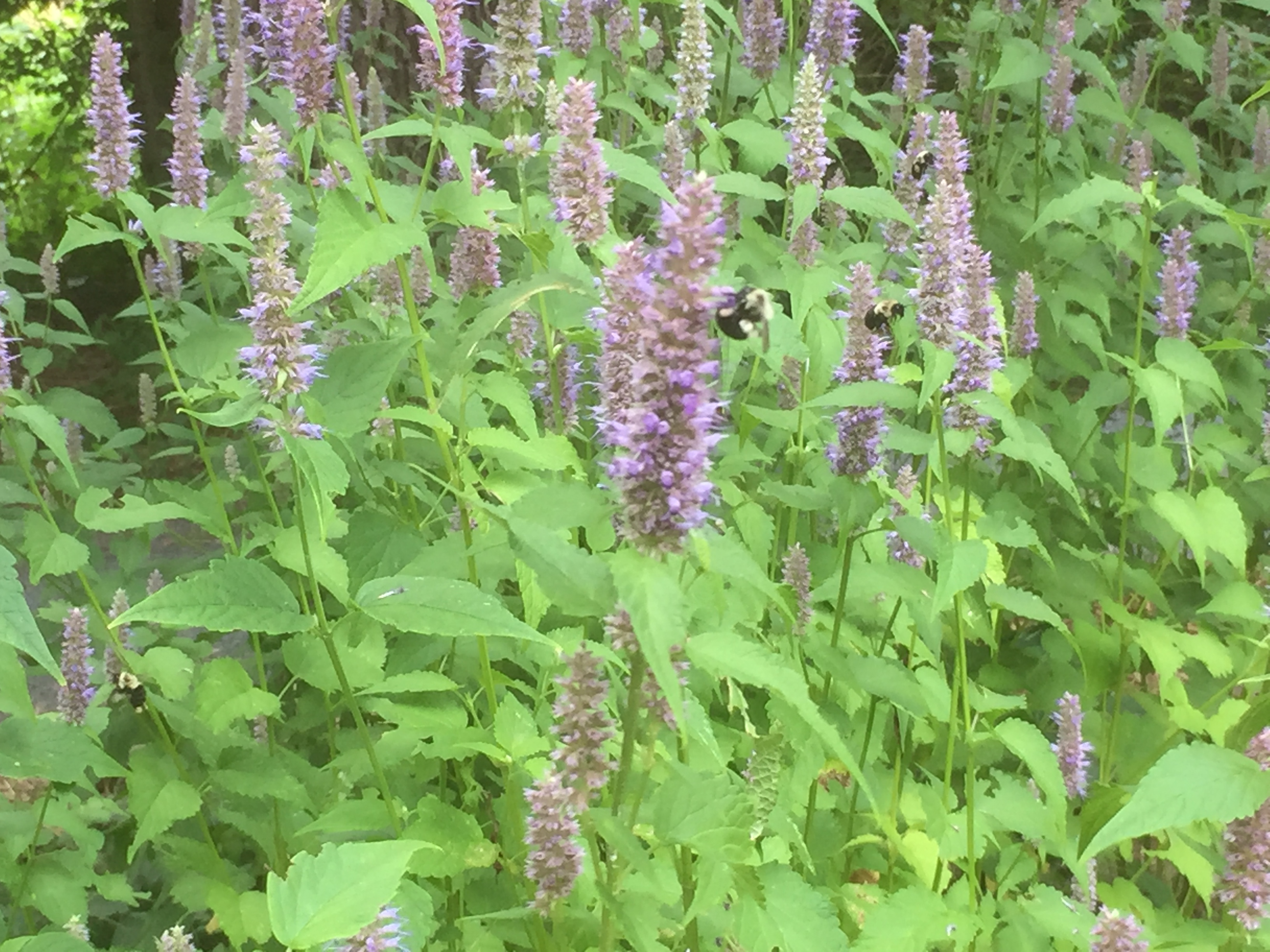
Pollinators feeding on an anise hyssop garden in Massachusetts

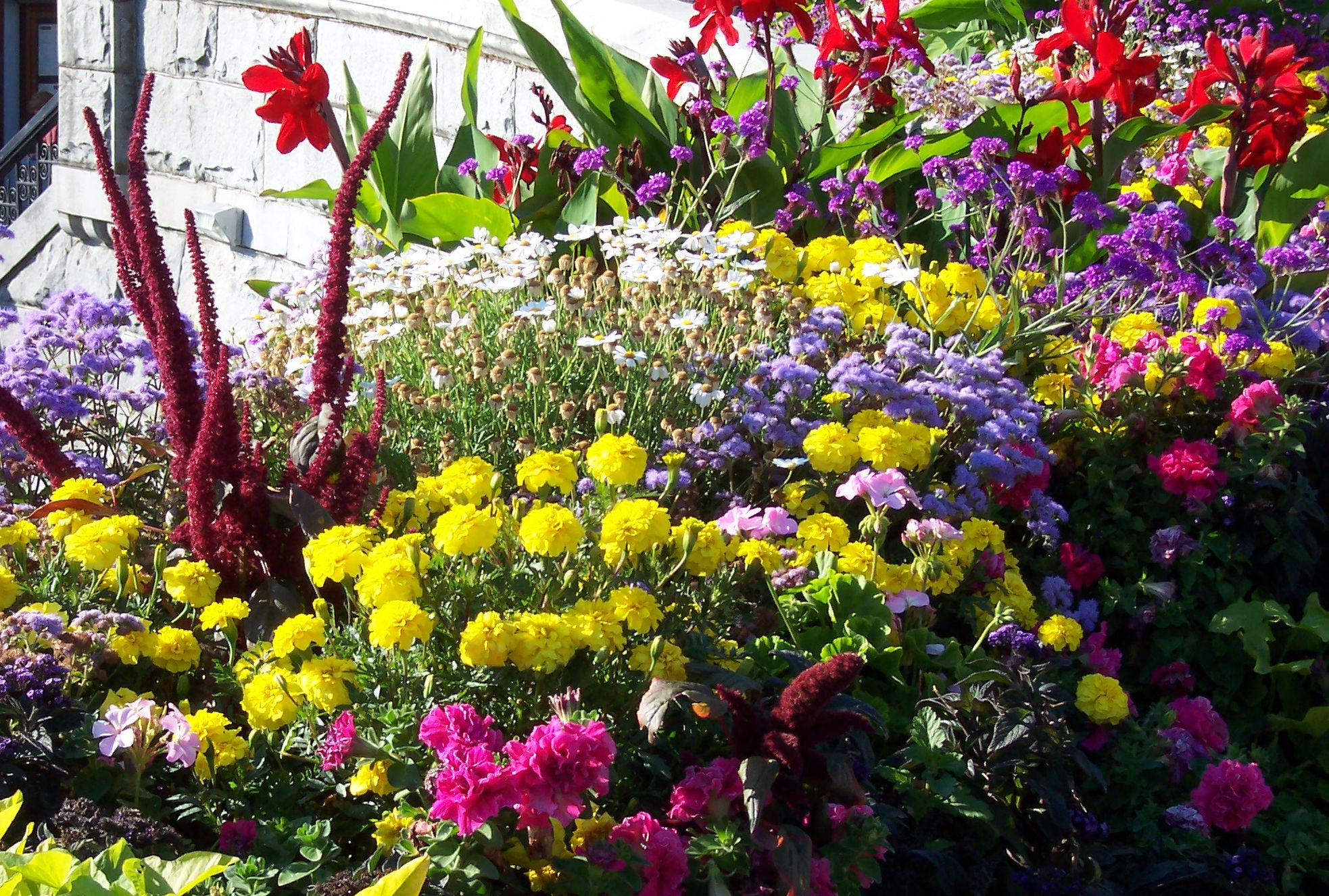
Pollinator Garden- Victoria, British Columbia

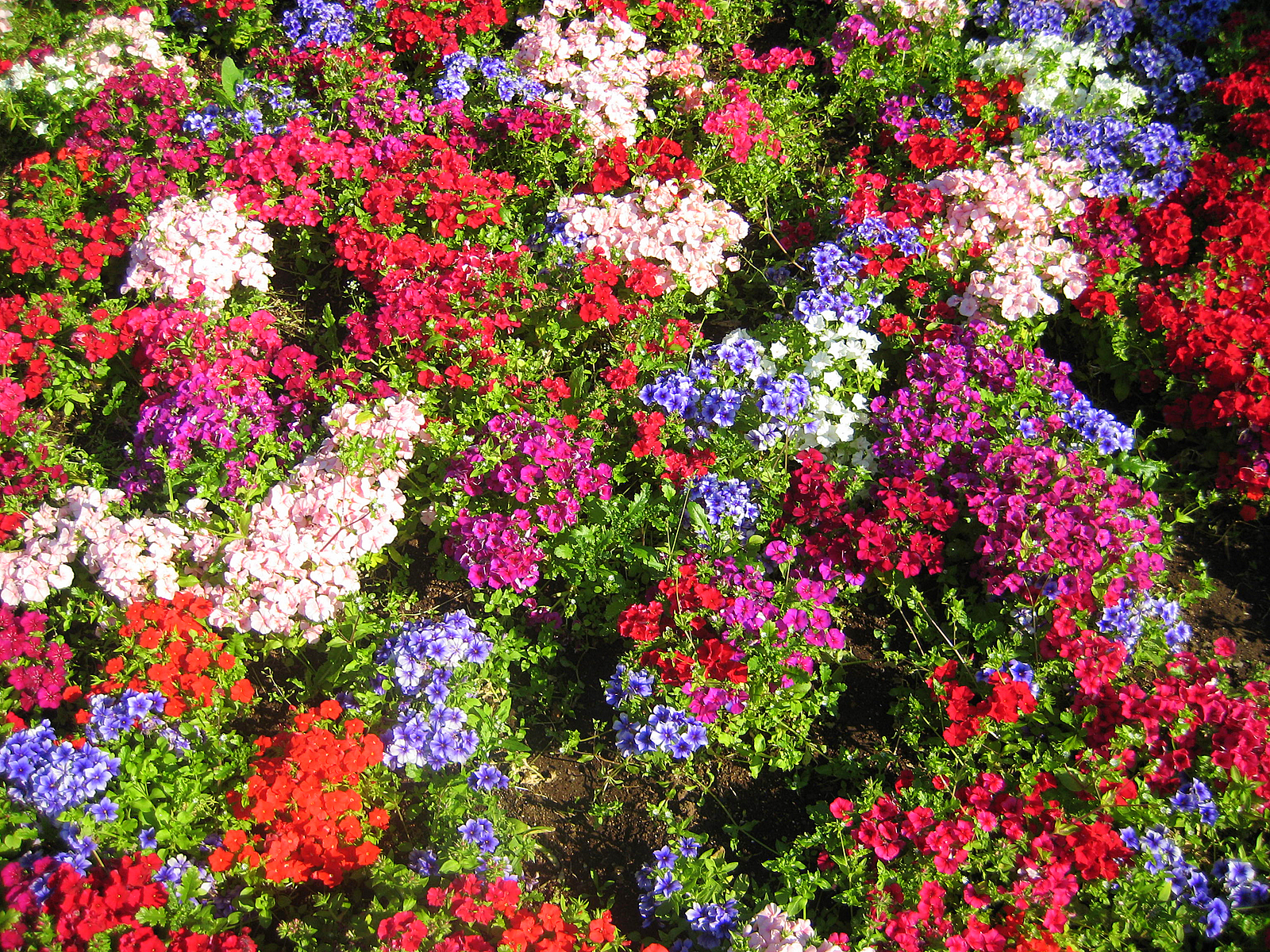
Example of Pollinator Garden Variety Reykjavík, Iceland

A pollinator garden is a type of garden designed with the intent of growing specific nectar and pollen-producing plants, in a way that attracts pollinating insects known as pollinators. Pollinators aid in the production of one out of every three bites of food consumed by humans, and pollinator gardens are a way to offer support for these species. In order for a garden to be considered a pollinator garden, it should provide various nectar producing flowers, shelter or shelter-providing plants for pollinators, and avoid the use of pesticides.

== Background ==
A pollinator garden is a group of plants grown together with the intention of attracting wild pollinators. Pollination is the reproductive process that enables plants to produce seeds. When pollen from the male part of one flower is moved to the female part of another flower of the same species, fertilization occurs. Once fertilized, a flower produces fruit and seeds. Some plants are pollinated by wind or water, but the majority are pollinated by animals called pollinators. By producing nectar to attract pollinators, plants encourage to move from flower to flower, carrying pollen with them and resulting in pollination. Close to 90% of all flowering plants are pollinated by animals. A vast majority of these pollinator species are insects, such as bees and butterflies, but animal pollinators can also include certain species of birds and mammals.

== Purpose ==
Pollinators play a vital role in human food production, and pollinator gardens are a way to support and protect essential pollinator species. Thirty-five percent of global food production is dependent on animal pollinators. Over 150 food crops rely on pollinators, including most of the fruits, vegetables, and nuts grown in the United States. Many pollinator species are currently threatened and in decline. In 2007, the National Research Council concluded that 40% of all insect pollinator species are currently at risk of extinction. Causes of pollinator decline include habitat loss, pesticide exposure, and loss of food sources due to the spread of non-native plant species. If pollinator habitats are not protected and new habitats are not created, the lack of plant pollination will ultimately affect humans. As pollinators decline, agricultural yields do as well. Without pollination, the main sources of human nutrition will suffer. Further, it is not just crops that are in danger, because 80-95% of non-crop plant species require some form of pollination as well. However, research shows that when the proportion of native pollinator plants in an area increases, so too does pollinator activity. Pollinator gardens are a way for these habitats to remain protected and encourage pollinators to continue pollinating plants around the world.

== Planting considerations ==
There are several considerations to keep in mind when planting pollinator gardens. Depending on what sorts of pollinators a gardener is hoping to attract, be it birds, bees, or butterflies, nectar, pollen, and larval-host plants appropriate for these species should be chosen. Gardeners are also encouraged to choose native plant species. A plant is considered to be a native species if it occurs naturally in a particular region or habitat without human introduction. Native plants have evolved to be best adapted and suited for the particular climate and growing conditions in which they are found and have often developed pollinator-specific relationships (i.e. monarch butterflies and milkweed). Additionally, choosing native plants ensures that surrounding native plant populations will not be outcompeted by introduced species.

It is also necessary to remember that different plants require different amounts of sunlight, water, and space. If a pollinator garden is damp and shady, plants adapted to sunny, dry conditions will not thrive there. Some plant species will spread aggressively, which is not ideal for small spaces. Similarly, container gardens are great for small spaces, but be sure to choose shallow-rooted species. The U.S. Fish and Wildlife Service also suggests that gardeners choose a variety of plants that flower at different times of the year. This not only provides nectar and pollen sources for pollinators throughout the growing season but also adds season-long visual interest. Further, it is important that pollinator gardens include structural elements such as nesting boxes and water sources to further support the complex life cycle of pollinators. Garden maintenance, such as mulching, weeding, and clearing, should also be timed appropriately so as not to interrupt particular pollinator life stages.

== National Pollinator Garden Network ==
In 2015 the (American) National Pollinator Garden Network launched its Million Pollinator Garden Challenge which encourages the entire nation to become aware of pollinators and their role. This challenge hopes to raise awareness so that existing habitats may be preserved and new habitats may be created. This project aims to help people understand the important role that pollinators play and why it is important to protect them.

== Legislation ==
Pollinator gardens are now making their way into politics. In 2015, the American Society of Landscape Architects (ASLA) joined forces with New York Senator Kirsten Gillibrand to encourage pollinator habitats on transportation right-of-way. This bill will be close to that of the bill H.R. 2738, the Highways Bettering the Economy and Environment Pollinator Protection Act

In June 2017, The House of Representatives moved the bill H.R. 3040. In Section 1. of the bill says that the Act may be referred to as "Saving America's Pollinators Act of 2017" This bill calls upon the Environmental Protection Agency (EPA) to take actions against particular pesticides that may negatively impact pollinators.

== Examples ==
- Dolores Pollinator Boulevard San Francisco, California
- A pollinator strip lies within the Regenstein Fruit & Vegetable Garden at the Chicago Botanic Garden in Chicago, Illinois
- Pollinators in Parks in 2017 Park Pride teamed up with Atlanta Botanical Garden to increase pollinator friendly plantings in five of Atlanta's parks.
- Pollinator Pathways This method can be seen in several cities.
- Wildlife Sanctuary located at Seattle University in Seattle, Washington

== See also ==
- List of garden types
- Landscape Architecture
- Pollinator Partnership
- Habitat Conservation
- Xerces Society
