= Insect biodiversity =

Diversity among species of insects

Insect biodiversity accounts for a large proportion of all biodiversity on the planet—over half of the estimated 1.5 million organism species described are classified as insects.

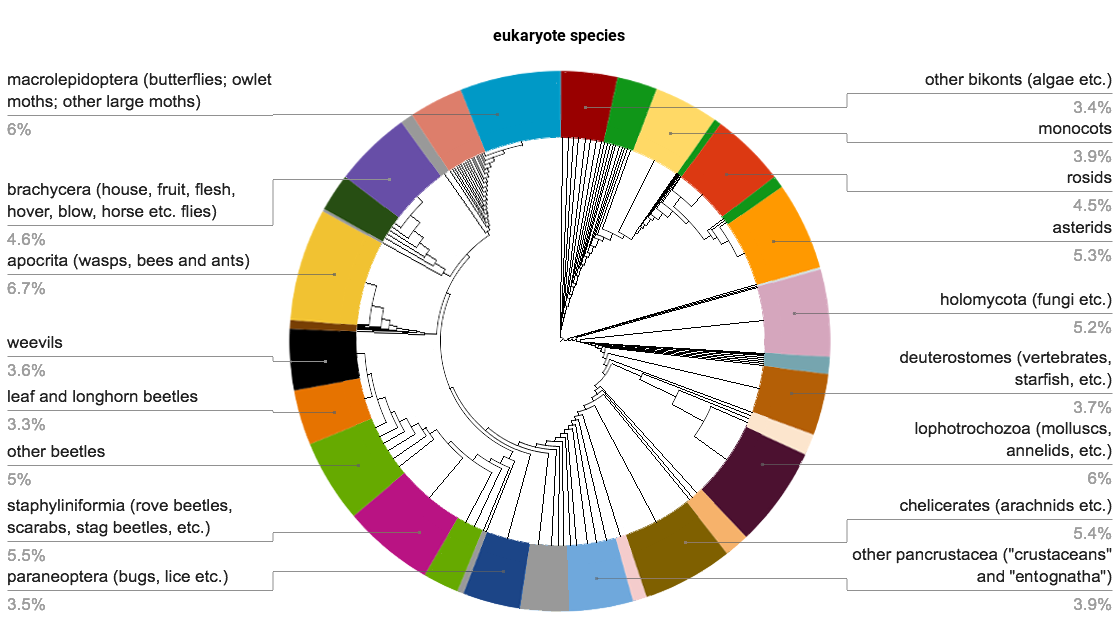
A pie chart of described eukaryote species, showing just over half of these to be insects

== Species diversity ==
Estimates of the total number of insect species or those within specific orders are often highly variable. Globally, averages of these predictions estimate there are around 1.5 million beetle species and 5.5 million insect species, with around 1 million insect species currently found and described. Between 950,000–1,000,000 of all described animal species are considered insects, so over 50% of all described eukaryotes (1.8 million species) are insects (see illustration). With only 950,000 known non-insects, if the actual total number of insects is 5.5 million, they may represent over 80% of the total, and with only about 20,000 new species of all organisms being described each year, most insect species likely will remain undescribed, unless species descriptions greatly increase in rate.

Of the 24 identified orders of insects, five dominate in terms of numbers of described species, namely Coleoptera (beetles), Lepidoptera (butterflies and moths), Diptera (flies and mosquitoes), Hymenoptera (ants, bees, wasps and sawflies) and Hemiptera (true bugs, e.g. cicadas, aphids, leafhoppers, bed bugs and assassin bugs). At least 900,000 described species — about 90% of all known insects — belong to the five aforementioned orders, each of which has over 100,000 species, while the next (sixth) most diverse order, Orthoptera (locusts, grasshoppers and crickets), has just under 24,000 species.

Number of described extant insect species
Order	Extant species described
Archaeognatha	513
Zygentoma	560
Ephemeroptera	3,240
Odonata	5,899
Orthoptera	23,855
Phasmatodea	3,014
Embioptera	463
Grylloblattidae	34
Mantophasmatodea	15
Plecoptera	3,743
Dermaptera	1,978
Zoraptera	37
Mantodea	2,400
Blattodea	7,314
Psocoptera	5,720
Phthiraptera	5,102
Thysanoptera	5,864
Hemiptera	103,590
Hymenoptera	116,861
Strepsiptera	609
Coleoptera	386,500
Neuroptera	5,868
Megaloptera	354
Raphidioptera	254
Trichoptera	14,391
Lepidoptera	157,338
Diptera	155,477
Siphonaptera	2,075
Mecoptera	757

The fossil record concerning insects stretches back for hundreds of millions of years. It suggests there are ongoing background levels of both new species appearing and extinctions. Very occasionally, the record also appears to show mass extinctions of insects. The Permian–Triassic extinction event saw the greatest level of insect extinction, with the Cretaceous–Paleogene being the second highest. Insect diversity has recovered after past mass extinctions, due to periods where new species originate with increased frequency, though the recovery can take millions of years.

=== In the Holocene ===
Several studies seemed to indicate that some insect populations are in decline in the late 20th and early 21st centuries, and has also been popularized as the windshield phenomenon. For many studies, factors such as abundance, biomass, and species richness are often found to be declining for some, but not all locations in many studies; some species are in decline while others are not. Every species is affected in different ways by changes in the environment, and it cannot be inferred that there is a consistent decrease across different insect groups. When conditions change, some species easily adapt to the change while others struggle to survive.

Concerns of declines in insect abundance in the holocene have been attributed to habitat loss from land use changes such as urbanization or agricultural use, pesticide use, invasive species, and artificial lighting. The use of increased quantities of insecticides and herbicides on crops have affected not only non-target insect species, but also the plants on which they feed. Climate change and the introduction of exotic species that compete with the indigenous ones put the native species under stress, and as a result they are more likely to succumb to pathogens and parasites.

As of 2017, at least 66 insect species extinctions had been recorded in the previous 500 years, which generally occurred on oceanic islands. For 203 insect species that had IUCN-documented population trends in 2013, 33% were in decline with variation in documented species across orders. Most scientific and public attention has been focused on the conservation of larger, charismatic vertebrates, and relatively fewer studies have been done on insect groups, especially Diptera, Orthoptera and Hemiptera. Data from the past from which to calculate trends is largely unavailable, and what does exist is mostly related to Western Europe and North America. Insect population assessments that have been undertaken were largely concentrated on the more popular insect groups, butterflies and moths, bees, dragonflies and beetles.

Some studies have suggested a large proportion of insect species (up to a third of the known species) are threatened with extinction in the 21st century, such as a 2019 review by Sánchez-Bayo and Wyckhuys, though ecologist Manu Sanders notes that many of these findings are often biased limited to specific geographic areas and specific groups of species. The methodology of the Sánchez-Bayo & Wyckhuys study has been questioned; the search string used to sift through the scientific literature was "(insect* + decline* + survey)". This meant that the authors identified studies finding insect declines, but may have missed those that found increases in insect populations or stability. In assessing the study methodology, an editorial in Global Change Biology stated, "An unbiased review of the literature would still find declines, but estimates based on this 'unidirectional' methodology are not credible. However, according to the authors of that review "more than half of the surveys were obtained from references cited in other reports" and "the 73 insect surveys cover all species in a particular taxon – irrespective of them exhibiting declines, stable or increasing trends in their distribution or abundance". Entomology professor Simon Leather suggested that media reports of an "Ecological Armageddon" may be exaggerated and advocated for more funding to allow better collection of long term data on the decline.

Claims of pending mass insect extinctions or "insect apocalypse" based on a subset of studies have been popularized in news reports, but often make claims extrapolated beyond the study data or hyperbolize study findings. The Entomological Society of America has stated there are not sufficient data to predict an imminent mass extinction of insects. For some insect groups such as some butterflies, bees, and beetles, declines in abundance and diversity have been documented in European studies. Other areas have shown increases in some insect species, although trends in most regions are currently unknown. It is difficult to assess long-term trends in insect abundance or diversity because historical measurements are generally not known for many species. Robust data to assess at-risk areas or species is especially lacking for arctic and tropical regions and a majority of the southern hemisphere.

== Conservation ==
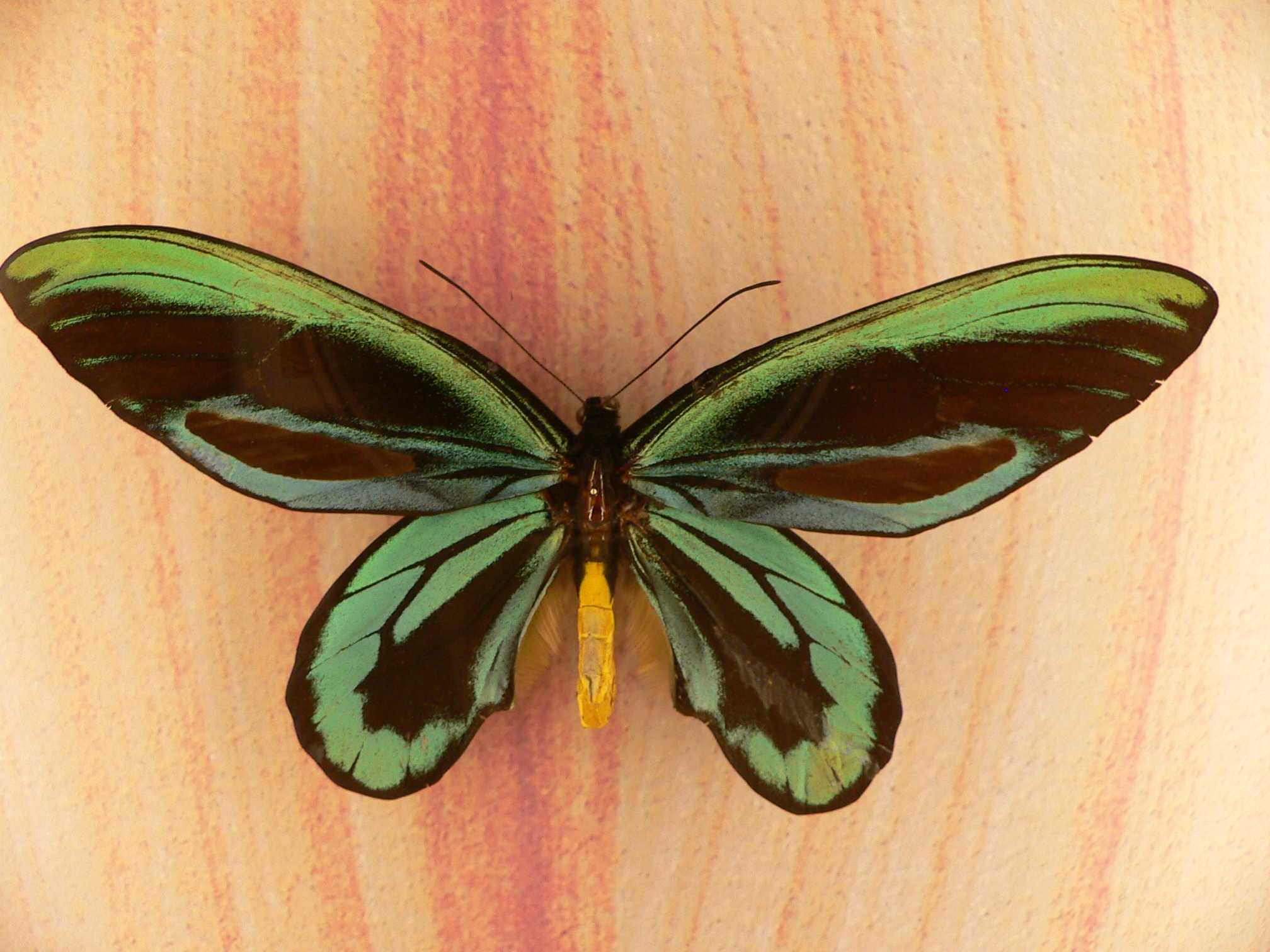
Queen Alexandra's birdwing (Ornithoptera alexandrae) of Papua New Guinea

While biodiversity loss is a global problem, conserving habitat for species of insects is uncommon and generally of low priority, although there are exceptions. More commonly insect conservation occurs indirectly, either through the setting aside of large portions of land using "wilderness preservation" as the motive, or through protection of "charismatic vertebrates". Some studies estimate that global insect populations are in rapid decline, perhaps by as much as 80% in recent decades. The windshield phenomenon describes people noticing vastly fewer insects flying into the path of their cars after long drives, and this may reflect worldwide loss of insect abundance.

Single-species insect conservation can preserve other species indirectly; this preservation-by-default is referred to as the umbrella effect. Showy insects such as butterflies or large, colourful beetles serve as flagship species, and can expand public awareness and financial contributions for conservation efforts. Wealthy nations such as the United States do list species of concern, and occasionally insects are placed on its Endangered Species List. In 2017 this list had classified over 80 insects as endangered species, the majority of them beetles or butterflies; a significant percentage of these listed insects are native only to the Hawaiian Islands. Migratory species, such as the well-known monarch butterfly (Danaus plexippus), are in need of special conservation methods. One species may require several habitat locations, even across international boundaries, for the different periods of their migratory patterns.

Insect conservation has been labelled in the past as a concern only for the affluent. The developing country of Papua New Guinea has a "happily ever after" ending in their attempts to preserve the world's largest butterfly, Queen Alexandra's birdwing (Ornithoptera alexandrae). This species is restricted to a very small range of habitat due to specificity in their diet. In the international market of insect collecting, the butterfly can retrieve up to US$2000. In 1978, the government of Papua New Guinea set up the Insect Farming and Trading Agency (IFTA) to regulate the exploitation and conservation of Queen Alexandra's birdwing and other valuable butterflies.

== Agriculture ==
In agricultural ecosystems, biodiversity is important for the production of food and for ecological services such as the recycling of nutrients, regulation of microclimate and local hydrological processes, and biological control of pests.

In the United States alone, pollination by bees accounts for over US$9 billion of economic revenue. According to some estimates, over ⅓ of the human diet can be traced directly or indirectly to bee pollination. Losses of key pollinators have been reported in at least one region or country on every continent except Antarctica, which has no pollinators. The Millennium Ecosystem Assessment concluded that with the global decline in the amount of pollinators, there is not a complete loss of fruit or seeds, but a significant decrease in quantity and viability in fruits, and a lower number of seeds.

== See also ==
- Defaunation
- Insect ecology
