= Zakaria Erzinçlioğlu =

British forensic entomologist

- Born: 30 December 1951; Hungary
- Died: 26 September 2002 (aged 50); England
- Education: University of Wolverhampton, Durham University
- Known for: Applying insect biology to criminal investigations; solving over 200 murder cases
- Notable work: Maggots, Murder and Men (2000), Every Contact Leaves a Trace (2001)
- Spouse: Sharon Wynne Davies (m. 1984)
- Children: 1 son, 2 daughters
- Awards: John Grundy Medal for medical entomology, Royal Army Medical College
- Scientific career
- Fields: Forensic entomology
- Workplaces: Zoological Society of London, University of Cambridge, Durham University

Zakaria Erzinçlioğlu (30 December 1951 – 26 September 2002), also known as Dr Zak, was a British forensic entomologist. He used his expertise in insect biology in criminal investigations and solved more than 200 murders, earning him an international reputation.

== Early life ==
Erzinçlioglu was born on 30 December 1951 in Hungary to parents of Turkish origin. He was brought up in Egypt, Sudan, and England.

He earned a degree in applied zoology from Wolverhampton Polytechnic in 1975, and then began working for the Zoological Society of London. He then studied for his doctorate at Durham University. In 1984 Erzinçlioğlu moved to Cambridge University where he wrote about blowflies for The Naturalists' Handbooks series, as well as writing for other publications. He also received funding to do research in forensic entomology and was later appointed director of a new Forensic Research Center at Durham University.

== Books ==
During the last years of his life, Erzinçlioglu spent time writing books from his home. Maggots, Murder and Men (2000) was the runner-up in the Crime Writers' Association 2001 Silver Dagger Award for non-fiction. He also wrote Every Contact Leaves a Trace (2001), as well as the children's story Ivo of the Black Mountain and a murder mystery Jackdraw Crag.

== Television ==
Erzinçlioğlu participated in several television programmes on forensic science, including The Witness was a Fly on the BBC.

== Awards ==
He was awarded the John Grundy Medal for medical entomology by the Royal Army Medical College.

== Personal life ==
Erzinçlioğlu married Sharon Wynne Davies in 1984. He had one son and two daughters.

He died on 26 September 2002 of a heart attack in England.
