= From the Top Down =

- Directed by: Daniel Vockins
- Release date: 2006
- Running time: 35 minutes
- Country: United Kingdom
- Language: English

From the Top Down is a 2006 British documentary film about the management and governance of the University of Sussex.

== Overview ==
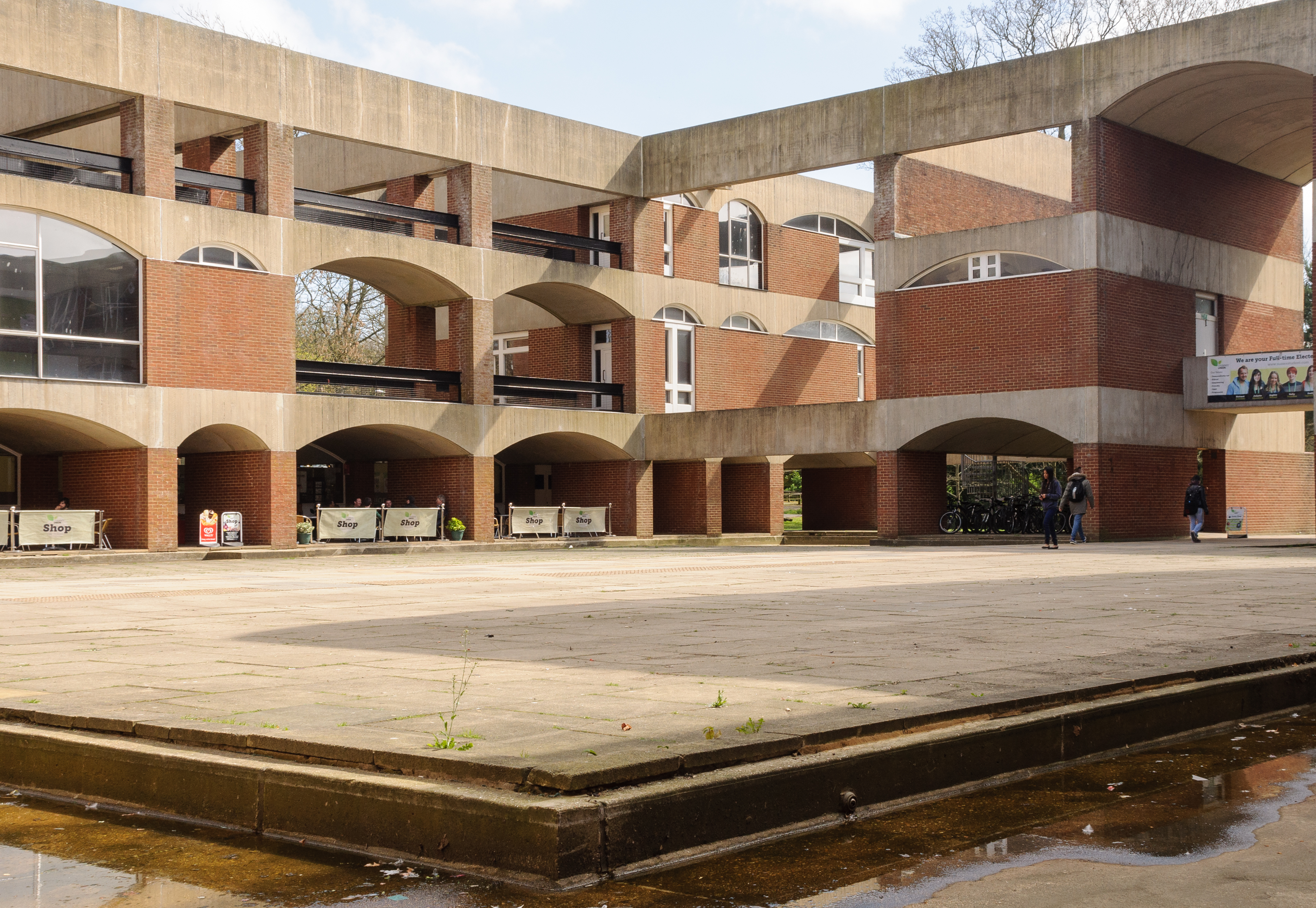
Falmer House at the University of Sussex

The film was made in response to the university's plans to close its chemistry department, which were abandoned in May 2006. The plans were met with protests in the media and in Parliament, and vice-chancellor Alasdair Smith was called before the Science and Technology Select Committee. The film also draws attention to Sussex's installation of a high-speed data network and its restructuring of academic departments, both of which ran significantly over budget; and claims the university was £38.2 million in debt. The film concludes by naming the university's governance as its primary problem, and calls for greater consultation with staff and greater accountability. From the Top Down lasts 35 minutes.

== Production and distribution ==
The film was directed by Daniel Vockins, then a second-year international relations and philosophy student, who said his intention was to produce an "objective analysis" of the university's problems. The information presented in the documentary is taken from Freedom of Information requests, official university documents and interviews with figures including Member of Parliament Des Turner and chemist Harry Kroto. Vockins said the university had warned against making the documentary and sought to prevent him from conducting interviews with academics.

The film was made available on the website of the Sussex student union and copies were sent to Sussex academics, vice-chancellors and student unions of 1994 Group universities, the Royal Society, then-Conservative Party higher education spokesman Boris Johnson, and others.

== Response ==
Smith said he was "pleased that our students feel passionately about Sussex, just as I and my colleagues do" but that it was a "pity that – despite opening initial discussions when filming starting – the students who made the film didn't seek to obtain views or comments from the university on the issues it raises". Smith also refuted allegations of financial mismanagement. A statement released by the university said many issues raised in the film had been rectified, that improvements were being made to student facilities, and that the university had sought to improve its relationship with the student union and strengthen student representation in its decision-making processes. Roger Hilton, the president of the student union, however, said that governance had not improved, to the detriment of "staff morale and the student experience."

William Outhwaite, a professor of sociology, and Andrew Chitty, a lecturer in philosophy, both praised the film. Chitty said "The film provides a convincing case for serious shortcomings in the management of the university over the last few years."
