= EVK =

EVK or evk can refer to:

- Evonik Industries, a German chemicals company, by stock ticker
- Estonian Sign Language, the national sign language of Estonia
- Evenkite, a rare hydrocarbon mineral, by mineral code
- Entomologischer Verein Krefeld, an entomological society based in Krefeld, North Rhine-Westphalia, Germany
- Everett Aviation, an airline based in Kenya, by ICAO code; see List of airlines of Kenya
- EVK, a dorm in the North Residential College in the Campus of the University of Southern California in Los Angeles, California, U.S.

== See also ==
- EVK College for Advanced Studies, a college within the Corvinus University of Budapest in Budapest, Hungary
- Evangelisches Krankenhaus Hamm, a hospital in Hamm, North Rhine-Westphalia, Germany
- E. V. K. Sampath (1926–1977), a politician from Tamil Nadu state, India
- E. V. K. S. Elangovan (fl. 2004–present), a different politician from Tamil Nadu state, India
