= Patricia Davidson =

Patricia Davidson may refer to:

- Patricia Davidson (Canadian politician) (born 1946), Conservative MP from Ontario
- Patricia M. Davidson, Australian professor of nursing
