= Bugs Matter =

International citizen science program

- Keywords: Insects, Citizen Science, Crowdsourcing
- Objective: Measuring and raising awareness of decline in insect populations
- Project coordinator: Buglife, Kent Wildlife Trust
- Partners: National Museum of Natural History, France
- Duration: 2019 –
- Website: Official website

Bugs Matter is an international citizen science program. It involves photographing a vehicle registration plate after a trip, using the Bugs Matter mobile app, to count the number of insects run over. The idea is to measure the windshield phenomenon attributed to a global decline in insect populations caused by human activity.

== Participation ==
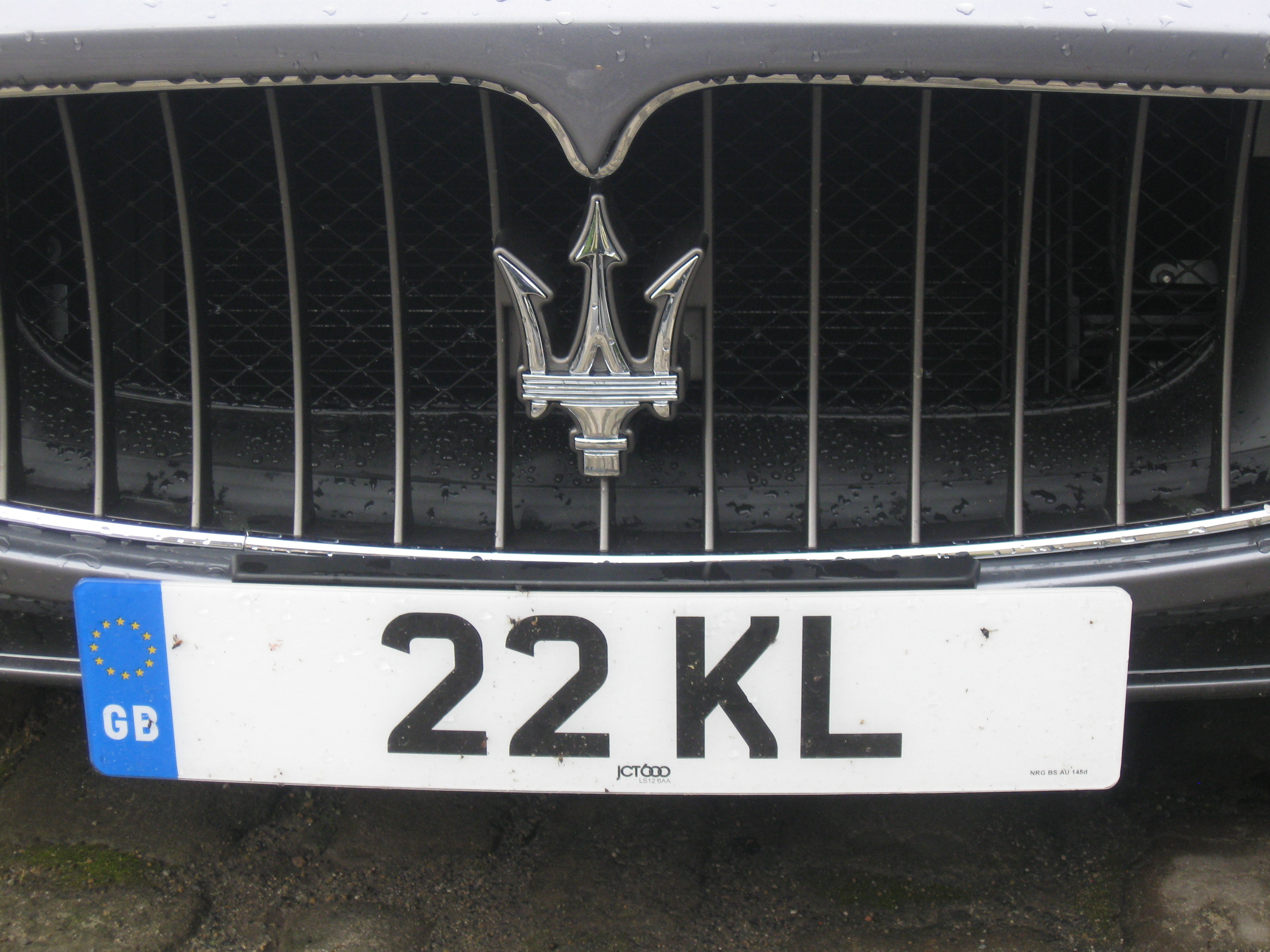
A license plate in the United Kingdom with bugs.

The protocol can be carried out by anyone, on any type of registered vehicle (car, van, truck, etc.), from April 1st to September 30th. The Bugs Matter app is available for download on Android (Google Play) and iPhone (App Store).

Before a trip, clean the front license plate. Open the Bugs Matter app. During the trip, keep the app and geolocation active. At the end of the trip, take a photo of the license plate with the app. The date, time, and trip details are submitted via the app.

== History ==
In June 2004, the Royal Society for the Protection of Birds (RSPB) introduced an innovative tool, the splatometer, a paper grid for counting insect impacts on license plates. The name splatometer is a humorous portmanteau of the English onomatopoeia "splat": the sound an insect makes when it splatters. The program was called the Big Bug Count and attracted 40,000 participants.

Fifteen years later, the conservation groups Buglife and Kent Wildlife Trust revived the program in Kent. The study took place from June 1 to August 31, 2019. The following year, it could not be conducted due to the COVID-19 lockdown in the United Kingdom.

In 2021, the program was expanded to the entire United Kingdom. The Bugs Matter mobile app was launched. It records the exact route of the vehicle. Paper "splatometers" were permanently phased out in 2023, and became virtual. From 2024, the study period was extended to include April and September.

In 2025, the program was expanded to Ireland. More than 10,000 motorists are registered. A study covering the period 2021–2024 revealed that the UK's flying insect population has declined by 63%. A dashboard for sharing the results is developed.

In April 2026, the protocol was translated and deployed in France by the National Museum of Natural History, France.

The idea is that license plates are standardized, all have the same size, the same orientation, and are placed at almost the same height. The French organisations Noé and OPIE are partners, as well as the French Office for Biodiversity.

== See also ==
- Butterfly count
- List of citizen science projects
