= Senior lecturer =

Academic rank

Senior lecturer is an academic rank in countries including the United Kingdom, Canada, Ireland, New Zealand, Australia, Switzerland, Germany, Austria, Israel and Sri Lanka. It is a faculty position at a university or similar institution, which is tenured (in systems with this concept) and is roughly equivalent to an associate professor in the North American system.

== Overview ==
Especially in research-intensive universities, lecturers lead research groups and supervise research students, as well as teach. After a number of years, lecturers might be promoted to senior lecturers with increasing research, leadership, and administrative responsibilities. In most research-intensive universities in the United Kingdom (such as those that are part of the Russell Group and 1994 Group), a senior lecturer position is between a lecturer and a reader, with a strong focus on research. At the same time, in some universities (for instance, University of Leeds), the rank of reader is no longer used for new appointments. A senior lecturer position can be a parallel position to reader in other universities. In some universities (notably post-1992 UK universities and former polytechnics), the senior lecturer and reader ranks denote different responsibilities, with the former being more teaching-focused and the latter being more research-focused. Senior lecturers can progress to either a reader or a professor position.

== Commonwealth and European usage ==
In most UK, New Zealand, Australian, Swiss and Israeli universities, there are ranks equivalent to senior lecturer (Oberassistent or Akademischer Oberrat in German, Chargé de cours in French, or מרצה בכיר in Hebrew), all being roughly comparable to the level of "associate professor" in North American universities, and "lecturer" is roughly equivalent to the North American "assistant professor". The ranks Lecturer and Senior Lecturer (without a translation into German) are also increasingly being adopted by universities in Germany and the German-speaking part of Switzerland. It is used for some members of academic staff with permanent positions.

Some British universities (for instance, Nottingham and Warwick) have recently decided to adopt the North American ranks of assistant and associate professor instead of lecturer and senior lecturer/reader. Some UK universities (for example, Plymouth University) use the rank of associate professor to denote the rank between a lecturer and a professor, but qualify it with 'senior lecturer' or 'reader' in the title, for example: Associate Professor (Senior Lecturer).

== North American usage ==
In the United States, Canada, and other countries influenced by their educational systems, the term is used differently, sometimes denoting academics without tenure who teach full or part-time but have few or no research responsibilities within the institution where they teach. Conversely, some universities use the term to refer to full-time, tenured faculty whose primary responsibilities are teaching and service instead of research. A convention some schools have begun to use is the title "teaching professor," with or without ranks, to clarify that these are in fact true faculty members who simply do not have research obligations. Senior lecturers sometimes have substantial experience and accomplishments in their field and possess a doctorate or its professional equivalent and sometimes just require a given number of years of experience. Also, in some schools it is a temporary post for visiting academics of considerable prominence—e.g. a famous writer may serve for a term or a year, for instance. In some colleges the term Senior Lecturer is awarded to highly qualified or accomplished lecturers.

== Singapore usage ==
The National University of Singapore introduced a teaching-only career pathway in 2008, which was reframed as an educator-track rank in 2015. Senior lecturer is equivalent to the level of senior assistant professor. The next rank is associate professor (educator track).

== Comparison ==
The table presents a broad overview of the traditional main systems, but there are universities which use a combination of those systems or other titles. Some universities in Commonwealth countries have also entirely adopted the North American system in place of the Commonwealth system.

North American system	Commonwealth system
(Full) Professor (upper half, including Distinguished professor or equivalent)	Professor (chair)
(Full) Professor (lower half)	Reader (or principal lecturer) (mainly UK, most of the Commonwealth and Ireland), or associate professor (traditionally in Australia, New Zealand, South Africa and Southeast Asia)
Associate professor	Senior lecturer (mainly UK, most of the Commonwealth including Australia, New Zealand, South Africa and Southeast Asia)
Assistant professor (commonly the entry-level position)	Lecturer (typically the first permanent position)
Instructor	Associate lecturer (commonly the entry-level position)
