= Tony Dixon (biologist) =

Anthony (Tony) Frederick George Dixon is a British biologist and professor of ecology. He is noted for his work on aphid population ecology and complex lifecycles. He is well known for his mentorship of a large number of ecological researchers. Dixon was born in London on 3 May 1932.

== Education and career ==
In 1956 Dixon was awarded a DPhil from the University of Oxford: A study of the searching behaviour of certain insects feeding on aphids. His doctoral advisor was the Hope Professor of Entomology, George C. Varley.

Dixon held academic roles at the University of Glasgow (1958-1975) before his appointment as professor at the University of East Anglia (UEA) in 1975, where he served as dean of the UEA School of Biological Sciences. He retired in 1997 and remains emeritus professor at UEA.

Dixon's research has focused on long-term population studies on tree aphids, basic and applied population dynamics, predator-prey relationships, insect-plant interactions, life history theory, and complex life cycles.

Over his career Dixon supervised more than 75 students, including Nigel Barlow, Simon Leather, Nicholas Mills, Marion Petrie, Allan Watt, Paul Wellings, and Steve Wratten. He played a significant role in the development of ecological entomology in the Czech Republic, Poland, and the UK. He demonstrated the importance of bottom-up processes in regulating populations at a time when it was fashionable to emphasize top-down mechanisms.

== Books ==
- Biology of Aphids, published by Hodder in 1976.
- Simulation of lime aphid population dynamics, with N.D Barlow, published by Wageningen Centre for Agricultural Publishing and Documentation in 1980.
- Cereal Aphid Populations: Biology, Simulation and Prediction, with N. Carter and R. Rabbinge, published by Wageningen Centre for Agricultural Publishing and Documentation in 1982.
- Aphid Ecology, first edition published by Blackie in 1985.
- Insect Predator-Prey Dynamics: Ladybird Beetles and Biological Control, published by Cambridge UP in 2000.
- Insect Herbivore-Host Dynamics, published by Cambridge UP in 2005.

== Awards and Recognition ==
Dixon has written and edited ten books on different aspects of aphid ecology, 320 scientific publications and has an H index of 80+. He has been recognized with following awards:

- Gregor Mendel Gold Medal (Czech Academy of Sciences) (1992)
- Emeritus Professorship UEA (1997)
- Medal of Honour (Akademia Podlaska) (2000)
- Laureate of the University of South Bohemia (2001)
- Hon Doctor of Science, Charles University (2013)
