= Paul Wellings =

Australian/British ecologist (born 1953)

Paul Wellings CBE DL FRSN FRSA FAICD
- Born: 1 November 1953 (age 73); Nottingham, England, United Kingdom
- Education: Lancaster Royal Grammar School
- Alma mater: King's College London (BSc); Durham University (MSc); University of East Anglia (PhD)
- Occupation: Former Vice-Chancellor of University of Wollongong
- Spouse: Annette Schmidt

Paul William Wellings (born 1 November 1953) is an Australian/British ecologist and long serving university leader. He is notable for his past service as vice-chancellor of University of Wollongong (2012–2021), Vice-Chancellor of Lancaster University (2002–2012) and Deputy Chief Executive of Australia's Commonwealth Scientific and Industrial Research Organisation (1999-2002).

== Education ==
Wellings was born in Nottingham on 1 November 1953 and grew up in India and Nigeria. He was educated at Lancaster Royal Grammar School, King's College London (BSc Joint Hons, Zoology and Botany), Durham University (MSc Advanced Ecology) and the University of East Anglia (UEA) (PhD, 1980). His PhD "Qualitative changes in the regulation of Sycamore aphid numbers" was supervised by Tony dixon (biologist).

== Career ==
He was awarded a NERC Personal Fellowship on life-history theory at UEA. In 1981, Wellings resigned his fellowship to take up a position in Australia as a research ecologist at the Commonwealth Scientific and Industrial Research Organisation (CSIRO), specialising in biological control. He was appointed Chief of CSIRO's Entomology Division in 1995. In 1997, he was seconded to the Australian Commonwealth Government Department of Industry, Science and Resources as Head of the Science and Innovation Policy Division and in 1999 returned to CSIRO as Deputy Chief Executive. In 2002, he moved to England to take up the position of vice-chancellor at Lancaster University. He held this post until his appointment at the University of Wollongong, NSW.

While at the University of Wollongong, Wellings oversaw a PPP (Public-Private Partnership) for capital works on the campus to build student housing. This PPP has been identified as "a half-billion-dollar disaster". Two years after Wellings took up his position, the university executed a 39-year PPP for its student accommodation portfolio that carried an estimated initial construction cost of AUD$140m and locked the university into rigid financial, building, and service obligations for decades. The deed required UOW to pay Contingent Financial Support (CFS) whenever student occupancy fell below base-case projections. The deed effectively guaranteed private investors (Balfour Beatty plc (UK) and HRL Morrison & Co (NZ)) around 85% of predicted revenues and appears to have offered a 15% annual rate of return. In 2017 UOW total borrowings surged from AUD$175m and was over AUD$724m by the early 2020s. Annual interest servicing costs rose to AUD$30m in 2022 and beyond; it still owes more than half a billion dollars. The senior executive teams that had committed the university to a 39-year concession and a half-billion-dollar exit then presented the resulting interest bill as an external constraint.

From 2020, senior executive teams have cited “operational financial distress” to justify several major restructurings, course closures, and the further casualisation of teaching. It took ICAC (Independent Commission Against Corruption) hearings to reveal the real magnitude of the malaise. Despite the extraordinary scale of the payout, trying to trace the transaction through UOW’s official annual financial statements or press releases results in encountering what has been described as a "fruit bowl of words and concepts". ICAC Exhibit 72 reveals that in UOW’s 2021 Annual Report (Note 34, page 70), the university recorded AUD$273,528,000 under “Current other financial liabilities at amortised cost”. Combined with a restated service-concession liability of AUD$169,067,000, the accounting obligation totals $442,595,000. Including other termination expenses, the total cost reached about AUD$500m.

Wellings retired as Vice-Chancellor of UOW on 30 June 2021.

He has been of Director of the Australian Nuclear Science and Technology Organisation (ANSTO), the Australian Centre for International Agricultural Research (ACIAR), the Cumbrian Rural Regeneration Company, the Bundanon Trust, University of Wollongong Global Enterprises and the Global Foundation. During his academic career he was a board member of Universities UK and chair of UUK's International and European Policy Committee, and a board member of Higher Education Funding Council for England (HEFCE) and Chair of HEFCE's Research Committee, Chair of the 1994 Group of research-intensive universities and, during the Coronavirus Pandemic, convener of NSW Vice-Chancellors Committee.

More recently he has been Deputy Chair of the General Sir John Monash Foundation and a board member of the Australian Research Council.

== Honours and distinctions ==
Wellings was appointed Commander of the Order of the British Empire (CBE) in the 2012 Birthday Honours for services to higher education. and Deputy lieutenant of Lancashire (2009). In 2018, Wellings was elected as a Fellow of the Royal Society of New South Wales. He holds honorary degrees from the Universities of Lancaster (2014), Surrey (2019), Wollongong (2021) and East Anglia (2022), and was awarded the 2020 CASE Asia-Pacific Leadership Award.

Portraits of Wellings hang at Lancaster University (Tai-Shan Schierenberg, 2011) and the University of Wollongong (Sally Robinson, 2021). The University of Wollongong's Molecular Sciences building is named in honour of its former Vice-Chancellor.

== Personal life ==
Wellings is married to linguist and designer, Annette Schmidt.

== Footnotes ==
Academic offices
Preceded by William Ritchie	Vice-Chancellor of Lancaster University; 2002–2011	Succeeded by Mark Smith
Preceded by Gerard Sutton	Vice-Chancellor of the University of Wollongong; 2012–2021	Succeeded by Patricia Davidson
