= Campus university =

A campus university is a university mainly located on a single site, with student accommodation, teaching and research facilities, and leisure activities all together, particularly in British English. It is derived from the Latin term campus, meaning "a flat expanse of land, plain, field".

The founding of these new institutions initiated a wave of far reaching expansion in higher education within the UK and helped open access to Higher Education to students who found access to the more traditional universities difficult or closed. The traditional universities tended to attract students from the exclusive private education sector in the UK and from privileged backgrounds whereas campus universities attracted students from all classes, backgrounds and schools (especially the state funded grammar and then later comprehensive schools).

These institutions also promoted "new" courses of study and so helped initiate not just a great expansion in numbers of students but also in the range of subjects studied.

As such, many students in the campus universities, particularly in the post-war period of 1950 to 1970, were the first member of their family ever to go to university, and were studying new and "exciting" topics, which lent a radical edge to the experience of higher education.

Campus universities are contrasted to city universities where facilities are distributed around the town or city, and the university consists of a number of sites, or even individual building. These include institutions such as the University of Edinburgh or the University of Sheffield, as well as collegiate universities such as the universities of Oxford, Cambridge and Durham. Multi-site universities often call each separate site a campus, and many campus universities now have expanded to more than one site (or campus), for example the University of Nottingham.

The classic campus university is often found on the edge of a city. Examples include:

- Aston University in Birmingham is a classic campus university, but located in the city centre of the city.
- University of Bath which is just outside the city of Bath
- University of Birmingham which is located in Edgbaston, 3 miles south-west of Birmingham
- Brunel University London which is in Uxbridge, on the edge of West London
- University of East Anglia which is 3 miles from the city of Norwich
- University of Essex near Colchester
- University of Exeter which has four campuses located in Devon and Cornwall
- Keele University near Newcastle-under-Lyme
- University of Kent which is just on the edge of the city of Canterbury
- Lancaster University near the city of Lancaster
- University of Nottingham which is located on the outer-suburbs of Nottingham
- University of Reading which has three campuses around Reading
- Robert Gordon University on the outskirts of Aberdeen
- University of Roehampton which is located in south-west London
- Queen Mary University of London which is located in Mile End, London
- Royal Holloway, University of London on the outskirts of London
- University of Stirling on the outskirts of Stirling
- University of Sussex which is 4 miles from the city of Brighton
- Swansea University which has two campuses, both 2 to 3 miles from Swansea
- University of Warwick near Coventry
- University of York on the outskirts of York

== See also ==
- Robbins Report
- British universities
- Post-1992 universities
- Russell Group
- 1994 Group
