= Stuart Edward Reynolds =

British scientist

Stuart Edward Reynolds FLS FRES (born 1949) is a British scientist known for his work on insects and microbes.

Reynolds holds an Emeritus Chair at the University of Bath and is a past president of the Royal Entomological Society (2010–12).

== Early life ==
Reynolds was born in Bradford, Yorkshire and grew up in Lancashire. He studied at Cambridge University.
