= Windshield phenomenon =

Insect population indicator

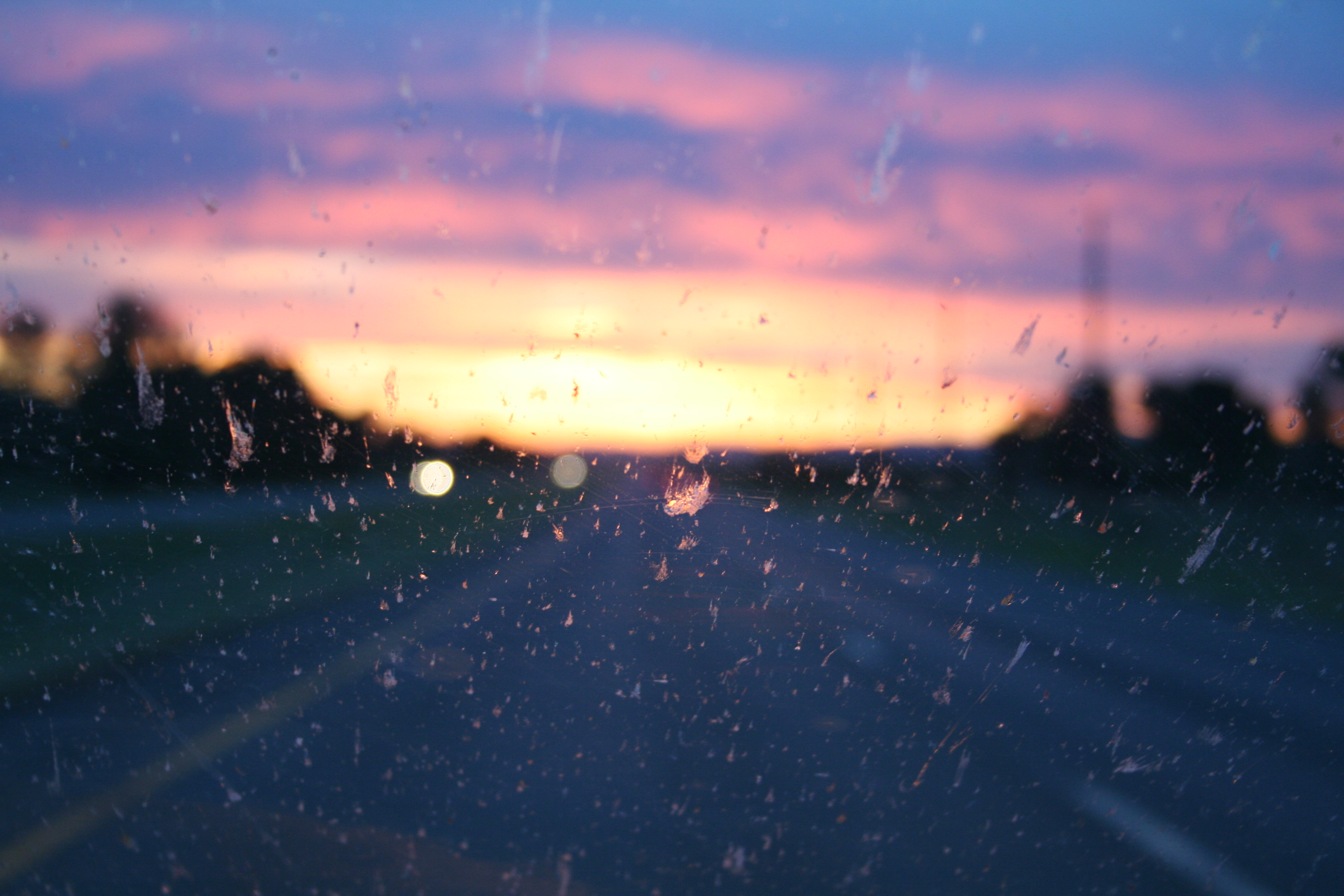
Insects smeared on a windshield

The windshield phenomenon (or windscreen phenomenon) is the observation that fewer dead insects accumulate on the windshields and front bumpers of vehicles since the early 2000s. It has been attributed to a global decrease of insect populations caused by human activity, e.g. use of pesticides.

== Background ==
As early as the 2000s it became a commonplace observation among drivers that after a long drive, windshields no longer had to be cleaned of numerous insects. In 2016, Canadian naturalist John Acorn noted that the phenomenon had recently become a meme but questioned whether it is "reasonable to assume that windshields can tell us something about the overall numbers of insects" and also that "humans are notoriously bad at detecting trends". The windshield phenomenon was discussed widely in 2017 after major publications and other media reported the topic of reductions of insect abundance during the last few decades. Entomologists stated that they had noticed that they no longer had to clean their windshields frequently.

== Studies ==
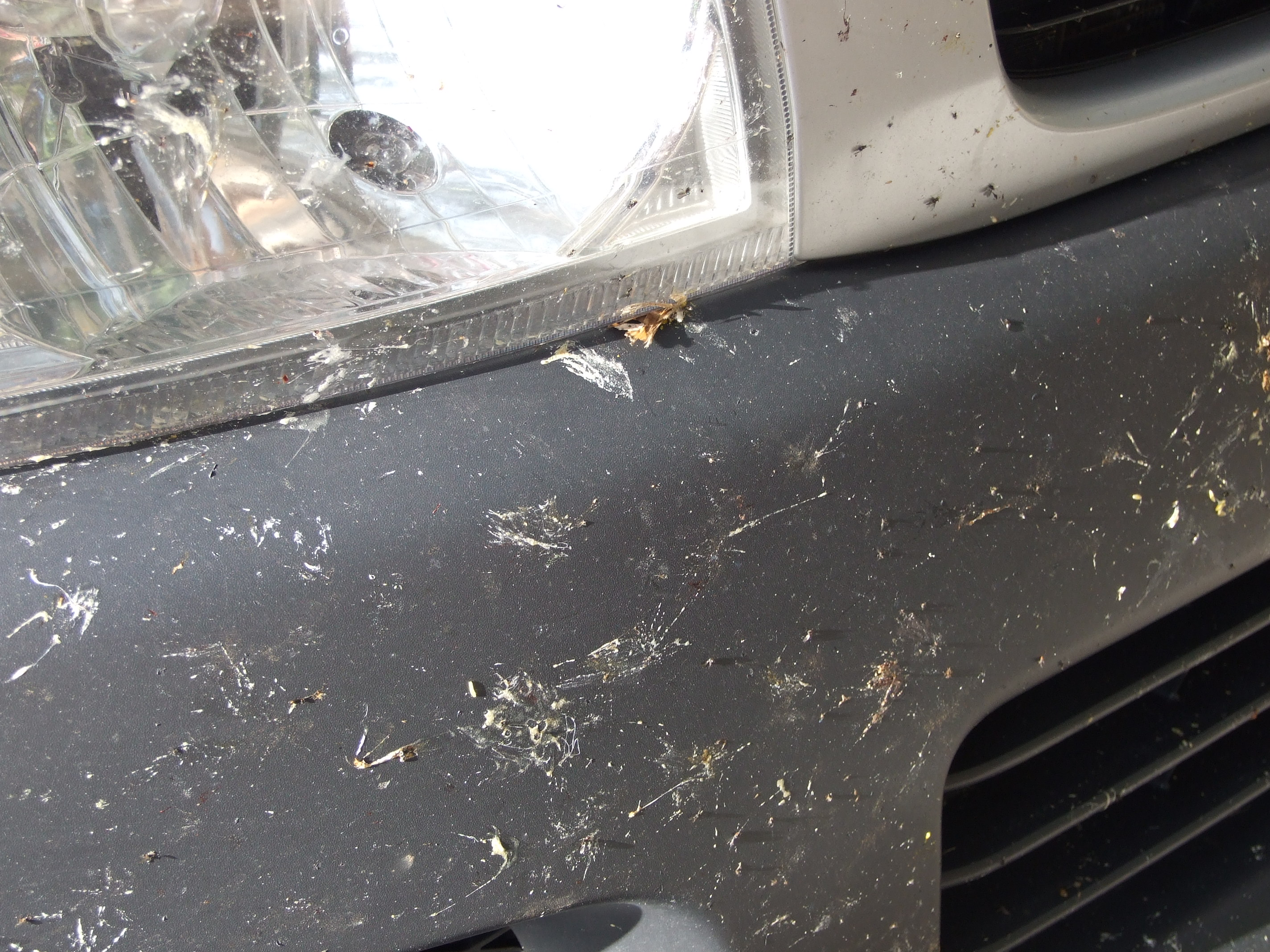
Impacts on a front bumper

=== United Kingdom ===
In 2004 the Royal Society for the Protection of Birds (RSPB) asked 40,000 motorists in the United Kingdom to attach a sticky PVC film to their number plate. One insect collided with the plate for every 8 kilometres (5 mi) driven. No historical data was available for comparison in the UK.

A follow-up study by Kent Wildlife Trust in 2019 used the same methodology as the RSPB survey. It showed half as many impacts as the earlier study. Research also found that modern cars with a more aerodynamic body shape killed more insects than boxier vintage cars.

Another survey was conducted in 2021 by Kent Wildlife Trust and nature conservation charity Buglife, which showed the number of insects sampled on vehicle number plates in Kent decreased by 72% compared to the 2004 results. The survey is called Bugs Matter.

In 2025, the now-annual survey conducted by Buglife in Kent found a decline of 66% in flying insects since 2021.
