= Entomologischer Verein Krefeld =

German learned society

- Abbreviation: EVK
- Formation: 1905
- Purpose: Maintaining records of the area's insects
- Headquarters: Marktstraße, Krefeld, Germany
- Key people: Martin Sorg (curator)
- Website: Entomologischer Verein Krefeld e.V.

The Entomologischer Verein Krefeld (EVK) is an entomological society based in Krefeld, North Rhine-Westphalia, Germany. Founded in 1905, it keeps meticulous records and specimens of the area's insects, a collection curated since 1987 by entomologist Martin Sorg.

The EVK is known in particular for a study it conducted, published in PLOS One in 2017, that demonstrated a 75 percent decline in flying insect biomass in 63 nature reserves in Germany between 1989 and 2016. The paper became the "third most frequently cited scientific study" of 2017 in the media, according to The Economist.

== Membership ==
Based in a former school in Krefeld's Marktstraße, the EVK has around 50 members, many of them hobbyists, who, according to Gretchen Vogel in Science, "have become world experts on their favorite insects". One member, Siegfried Cymorek, who did not graduate from high school, was awarded an honorary doctorate in 1979 by the Swiss Federal Institute of Technology in Zurich for his research into the woodboring beetle.

The society is a member of the Deutsche Gesellschaft für allgemeine und angewandte Entomologie (German Association for General and Applied Entomology).

== Curators ==
- Ernst Puhlmann (1864–1959), from before World War II until 1943
- Bruno Maixner (1902–1999) from 1943 to 1958
- Siegfried Cymorek (1927–1987) from 1958 to 1987
- Martin Sorg, since 1987

== 2017 study ==
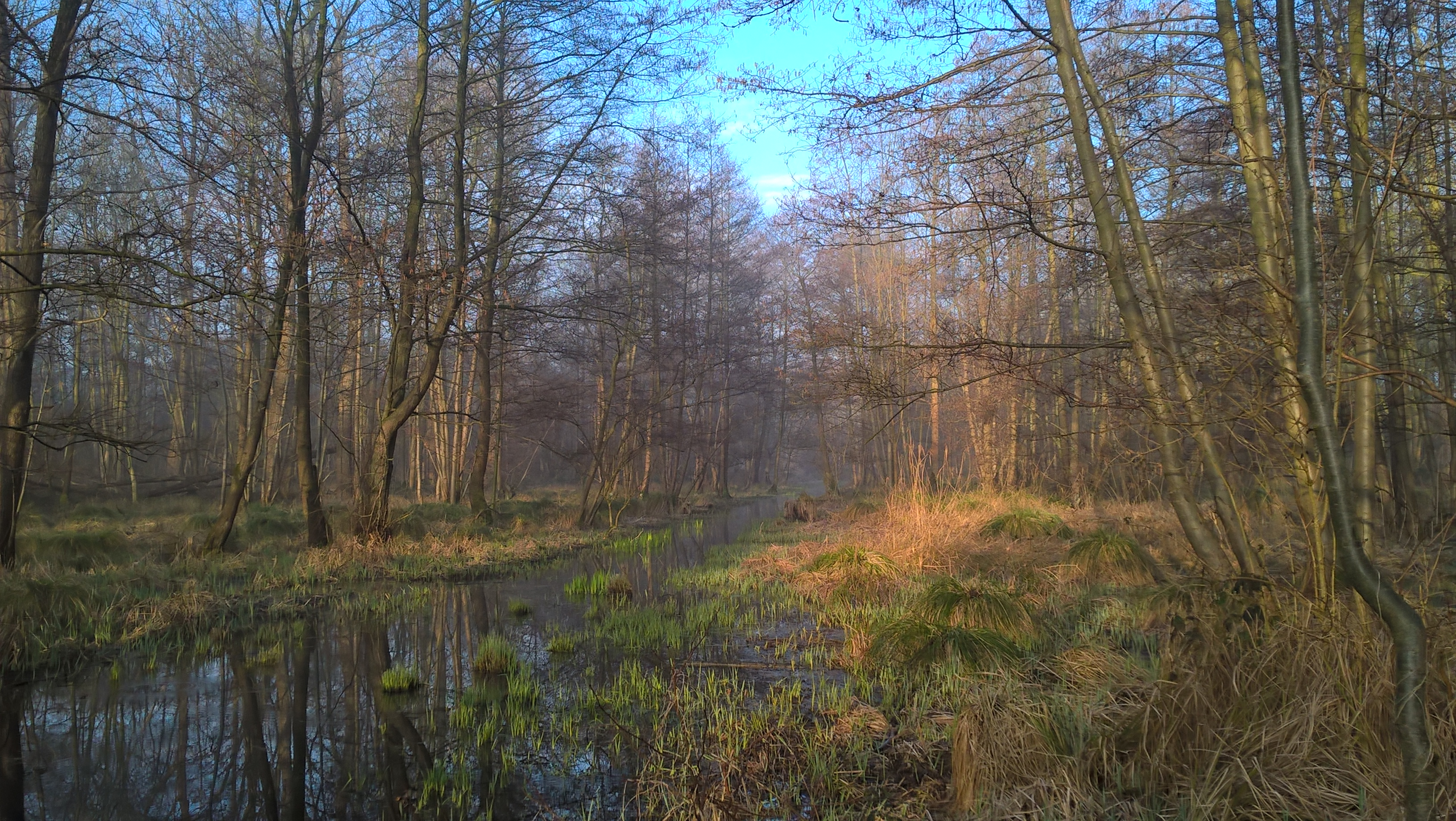
One of Krefeld's nature reserves

The society is noted for a study it conducted, first published in 2013, in which it examined data from malaise traps in 63 nature reserves in Germany, most of them in the Krefeld area. Reanalysed and republished in 2017 in PLOS One, the study showed that, between 1989 and 2016, there had been a 75 percent decline in flying insect biomass in the nature reserves. The paper attracted widespread attention. According to The Economist, it was the "third most frequently cited scientific study" in the media in 2017. The society won a Science Hero prize for the work.

== See also ==
- Decline in insect populations
