= Simon Leather =

Entomologist

- Education: University of Leeds (BSc) University of East Anglia (PhD)
- Scientific career
- Workplaces: Forestry Commission, Imperial College London, Harper Adams University
- Thesis: Aspects of the ecology of the bird cherry-cat aphid Rhopalosiphum padi L (1980)
- Doctoral advisor: Tony dixon (biologist)

Simon R Leather Hon.FRES (13 March 1955 - 27 September 2021) was an entomologist in the UK, he was Professor of Entomology at Harper Adams University, Honorary Fellow of the Royal Entomological Society and an expert on aphids and applied entomology.

== Education and career ==
Leather had a childhood interest in insects and was educated at King George V School (Hong Kong) and Ripon Grammar School, he studied BSc Agricultural Zoology at the University of Leeds, graduating in 1977; and a PhD on the ecology of the bird cherry-oat aphid at the University of East Anglia, graduating in 1980. He was a Royal Society postdoctoral fellow in Finland, working on the bird cherry-oat aphid, he moved back to UEA and then worked at the Forestry Commission.

In the early 1990s he moved the Silwood Park campus of Imperial College London to be a lecturer, rising to Reader in Applied Ecology, in 2012 Leather moved to Harper Adams University to be Professor of Entomology.

== Academic activities ==
Leather did extensive research into integrated pest management of insect pests in agriculture, horticulture and forestry and he was a member of the UK government's Tree Health and Plant Biosecurity Taskforce.

His work on aphids includes the discovery in pea aphids of cannibalistic behaviour.

Leather has also carried out research in urban ecology, looking at the biodiversity value of roundabouts for over 10 years in Bracknell Forest.

He was an advocate of the need for specialist training in entomology and taxonomy and before his move to Harper Adams University was concerned that his then unique (in the UK) Masters courses in Entomology, Integrated Pest Management and Plant Pathology would cease on his eventual retirement. In 2009 he coined the phrase 'institutional vertebratism' to describe the bias of scientific research funding to vertebrate animals, rather than the more numerous invertebrates.

In late 2012 Leather joined Twitter with the account handle @entoprof and in 2013 he started a personal blog Don't forget the roundabouts. He talked and wrote about new platforms for non-academic science communication that are available online.

== Books ==
- Ecology of Insect Overwintering, with Keith Walters and Jeff Bale, published by Cambridge University Press in 1993.
- Insect Reproduction, with Jim Hardie, published by CRC Press in 1995.
- Insects on cherry trees with Keith Bland, number 27 in the Naturalists' Handbooks series in 1999, now published by Pelagic Publishing.
- Edited Insect Sampling in Forest Ecosystems published by Wiley in 2005.
- Insects: A Very Short Introduction published by Oxford University Press in 2022, part of the Very Short Introductions series.

== Honours and awards ==
- Made Honorary Fellow of the Royal Entomological Society in 2015.
- Was a past president of the Amateur Entomologists Society.
- Founding editor of the journal Insect Conservation & Diversity, with Yves Basset and Raphael Didham
- Editor in Chief of the Association of Applied Biologist's journal Annals of Applied Biology.
