= Patricia M. Davidson =

Australian professor of nursing

- Born: 23 April 1957 (age 69); Canberra, Australian Capital Territory, Australia
- Citizenship: Australian
- Education: University of Newcastle (Australia); University of Wollongong
- Known for: Transitional care, underserved populations, global healthcare
- Awards: Fellow American Academy of Nursing; Fellow American Heart Association; Fellow Australian Academy of Health and Medical Sciences; Nurse Researcher Hall of Fame, STTI; Honorary Fellow Royal College of Nursing (hon)
- Scientific career
- Fields: Cardiac nursing, Academic administration
- Workplaces: University of Wollongong; Johns Hopkins University; University of Technology Sydney; Curtin University; Western Sydney University
- Thesis: Living with heart failure (2003)

Patricia M. Davidson (born Canberra, 23 April 1957) is an Australian nursing educator. She is best known for her contributions improving cardiac nursing and transitional care with a focus on underserved populations in a global context, and for her leadership in higher education.

From 2013 to 2021 she was Professor of nursing and dean of the School of Nursing at Johns Hopkins University.

Davidson earned her BA (1985) in education and her MEd (1993) in education at the University of Wollongong, and she earned her doctorate in 2003 from the University of Newcastle (Australia).

Prior to joining Johns Hopkins University as Dean of Nursing in 2013, Davidson was a professor at University of Technology, Director at Curtin University, and member of the faculty of Western Sydney University.

Davidson is an advocate for nursing in the public sphere, and she is a regular contributor to letter to the editor and to op-ed including the HuffPost where she has written about updating the modern image of nursing through the "#WeGotThis" campaign and about the role of men in nursing

In 2016, Davidson signed an open letter to the faculty of Johns Hopkins University re-affirming the institutional commitment to supporting the LGBT community including gender affirming surgery.

In 2007, Davidson was inducted as a Fellow of the Australian College of Nursing. In 2013, she was inducted as a Fellow of the American Academy of Nursing, a Fellow of the American Heart Association, and a Fellow of the Preventive Cardiovascular Nursing Association.

Davidson received the outstanding alumni award from the University of Wollongong in 2013 and the alumni award for professional excellence from University of Newcastle (Australia) in 2014. In 2022 Davidson was awarded honorary fellowship of the Royal College of Nursing, FRCN(hon). She was elected a Fellow of the Australian Academy of Health and Medical Sciences in 2024.

In September 2020, Professor Davidson was named as the next Vice-Chancellor of the University of Wollongong, succeeding Paul Wellings in May 2021. She was the first alumnus of the university to fill the position. In August 2021 the title of the position was changed to Vice-Chancellor and President. Midway through her contract she resigned from that role in April 2024 at short notice.

Academic offices
Preceded by Paul Wellings	Vice-Chancellor of the University of Wollongong; 2021–2024	Succeeded by John Dewar
