= The Naturalists' Handbooks =

Series of natural history books

The Naturalists' Handbooks is a series of natural history books aimed at students, naturalists and ecologists. Most volumes cover topics relating to insects, but some cover other groups of invertebrates, and some are botanical or mycological in scope, and other cover study techniques. The series first handbook, Insects on Nettles was published in 1983.

== Volumes ==
A list of the volumes published to date is:

1. Insects on Nettles by B N K Davis (1991)
2. Grasshoppers by V K Brown (1990)
3. Solitary Wasps by Peter F Yeo and Sarah A Corbet (1995)
4. Insects and Thistles by Margaret Redfern (1995)
5. Hoverflies by Francis S Gilbert (1993)
6. Bumblebees by Oliver E Prys-Jones and Sarah A Corbet (1991)
7. Dragonflies by Peter L Miller (1995)
8. Common Ground Beetles by Trevor G Forsythe (1987)
9. Animals on Seaweed by Peter J Hayward (1998)
10. Ladybirds by Michael Majerus and Peter Kearns (1989)
11. 11 Aphid Predators by Graham E Rotheray (1989)
12. Animals on the Surface Film by Marjorie Guthrie (1989)
13. Mayflies by Janet Harker (1989)
14. Mosquitoes by Keith R Snow (1990)
15. Insects, Plants and Microclimate by D M Unwin and Sarah A Corbet (1991)
16. Weevils by M G Morris (1991)
17. Plant Galls by Margaret Redfern and R R Askew (1992)
18. Insects on Cabbages and Oilseed Rape by William D J Kirk (1992)
19. Pollution Monitoring with Lichens by D H S Richardson (1992)
20. Microscopic Life in Sphagnum by Marjorie Hingley (1993)
21. Animals of Sandy Shores by Peter J Hayward (1994)
22. Animals under Logs and Stones by C Philip Wheater & Helen J Read (1996)
23. Blowflies by Zakaria Erinçlioglu (1996)
24. Ants by Gary J Skinner
25. Thrips by William D J Kirk (1996)
26. Insects on Dock Plants by David T Salt & B Whittaker (1998)
27. Insects on Cherry Trees by Simon R Leather & Keith P Bland (Spring 1999)
28. Studying Invertebrates by C Philip Wheater & Penny A Cook (2003)
29. Aphids on deciduous trees by Tony Dixon & Thomas Thieme (2020)
30. Snails on rocky sea shores by John Crothers (2012)
31. Amphibians and reptiles by Trevor J. C. Beebee
32. Ponds and Small Lakes: Microorganisms and Freshwater Ecology by Brian Moss (2017)
33. Solitary bees by Ted Benton (2017)
34. Leaf beetles by Dave Hubble (2017)
