= 1994 Group =

British research university group (1994–2013)

- Formation: 1994
- Dissolved: 2013
- Type: Association of UK universities
- Location: United Kingdom
- Members: 11
- Chair of the Board: Professor Michael Farthing
- Key people: Executive Director: Alex Bols
- Website: www.1994group.ac.uk

The 1994 Group was a coalition of smaller research-intensive universities in the United Kingdom, founded in 1994 to defend these universities' interests following the creation of the Russell Group by larger research-intensive universities earlier that year. The 1994 Group originally represented seventeen universities, rising to nineteen, and then dropping to eleven. The group started to falter in 2012, when a number of high performing members left to join the Russell Group. The 1994 Group ultimately dissolved in November 2013.

== Role ==
The group sought "to represent the views of its members on the current state and the future of higher education through discussions with the government, funding bodies, and other higher education interest groups" and "[made] its views known through its research publications and in the media". University Alliance, million+, GuildHE and the Russell Group were its fellow university membership groups across the UK higher education sector.

== Members at time of dissolution ==
Institution	Location	Established	Gained university status	Total number of students	Research funding (£Thousand)
Birkbeck, University of London	London	1823	1920	19,020	9,985
University of East Anglia	Norwich	1963	1963	19,585	16,482
University of Essex	Colchester	1964	1964	11,690	9,967
Goldsmiths, University of London	London	1891	1904	7,615	8,539
Institute of Education, University of London	London	1902	1932	7,215	7,734
University of Lancaster	Lancaster	1964	1964	12,695	18,640
University of Leicester	Leicester	1921	1957	16,160	22,225
Loughborough University	Loughborough	1909	1966	17,825	22,398
Royal Holloway, University of London	Egham	1849	1900	7,620	13,699
SOAS, University of London	London	1916	1916	4,525	7,238
University of Sussex	Brighton	1961	1961	12,415	16,196

== Historical membership ==
The following table shows the membership of the group since its formation in 1994.

Institution	Location	Year joined	Year left
University of Bath	Bath	1994	2012
Birkbeck, University of London	London	1994	
Durham University	Durham	1994	2012
University of East Anglia	Norwich	1994	
University of Essex	Wivenhoe (Essex)	1994	
University of Exeter	Exeter	1994	2012
Goldsmiths, University of London	London	1994	
Institute of Education, University of London	London	2009	
University of Lancaster	Lancaster	1994	
University of Leicester	Leicester	2006	
London School of Economics	London	1994	2006
Loughborough University	Loughborough	2006	
University of Manchester Institute of Science and Technology (UMIST)	Manchester	1994	2004
Queen Mary, University of London	London	2006	2012
University of Reading	Reading	1994	2013
Royal Holloway, University of London	Egham	1994	
University of St Andrews	St Andrews	1994	2012
SOAS, University of London	London	2006	
University of Surrey	Guildford	1994	2012
University of Sussex	Brighton	1994	
University of Warwick	Coventry	1994	2008
University of York	York	1994	2012

The University of Manchester Institute of Science and Technology (UMIST), which merged with the Victoria University of Manchester to form the University of Manchester, was a member of the 1994 Group until October 2004. The London School of Economics was also a member until 2006, and the University of Warwick until July 2008. Durham University, University of Exeter, Queen Mary, University of London and University of York left the 1994 group in 2012. All have now joined the Russell Group. In October, the University of St Andrews and University of Bath withdrew from membership of the group. The University of Surrey also announced its intention to leave the group on 6 November 2012. On 19 December 2012 the University of Reading announced that it would cease to participate in the group, although its membership formally ended in July 2013.

== 1994 Group position in league tables ==
University	ARWU (2013, World)	QS (2013/14, World)	THE (2013/14, World)	Complete (2014, National)	The Guardian (2014, National)	Times/Sunday Times (2014, National)
Birkbeck, University of London	–	374	201–225	–	–	–
University of East Anglia	201–300	229	174	20	17	17
University of Essex	401–500	338	251–275	39	63	39
Goldsmiths, University of London	–	461–470	–	51	58	48
Institute of Education, University of London	–	–	–	–	–	–
University of Lancaster	301–400	156	137	11	11	12
University of Leicester	201–300	202	161	16	13	14
Loughborough University	–	244	351–400	14	14	21
Royal Holloway, University of London	–	265	102	30	38	28
School of Oriental and African Studies	–	337	–	33	22	24
University of Sussex	101–150	193	121	31	50	32

== Governance and management structure ==
The 1994 Group was headed by a board made up of the heads of member institutions. The board met formally five times a year. In addition, an annual residential conference took place in the summer where longer-term strategic issues were discussed. The board had responsibility for determining strategy and agreeing all policy papers, position statements and consultation responses, and responsibility for the governance of all joint activity.

The chair was elected by board members for a three-year term of office. Professor Michael Farthing, vice-chancellor of University of Sussex, was elected chair in 2011. The chair was the national spokesperson for the group and represented its interests where a senior representative of the group was required. The chair had overall responsibility for the development and delivery of the communication strategy on behalf of the board. Previous chairs included: 1997-2000 Sir Ivor Crewe (Essex); 2000-03 Alisdair Smith (Sussex); 2003-06 Sir David Eastwood (UEA); 2006-09 Sir Steve Smith (Exeter); 2009-12 Paul Wellings CBE (Lancaster); 2012- close Michael Farthing (Sussex).

The chair was assisted by a Chair's Advisory Group (CAG) elected from the board for a three-year period of office (initial membership was staggered to ensure a rolling change of membership). The CAG met on four occasions each year. CAG members had a general brief for assisting the chair in the development of all areas of group policy (including management of the relationship with the Policy Groups). The CAG had a central role in the development of relationships with government, funding bodies, and HE stakeholder organisations.

== Policy groups ==
The 1994 Group had three high-level Policy Groups that met three times a year to discuss longer-term strategy and policy issues. The 1994 Group's Student Experience Policy Group aimed to identify the key issues surrounding student experience in the HE sector, defining the 1994 Group's own position in this context, and identifying potential areas for research and activity in the future. The Research and Enterprise Policy Group aimed to strengthen the research carried out by its members by investigating funding and other issues. The Strategic Planning and Resources Policy Group developed policies and guidelines in response legislative and financial changes affecting the group's members.

== See also ==
- British university
- List of universities in the United Kingdom

Types of UK university

- Ancient university
- Red brick university
- Plate glass university
- Technological university
- Campus university

International groups of universities

- Association of American Universities
- Group of Eight
- Innovative Research Universities Australia
- U15 Group of Canadian Research Universities
- U15 (German universities)
- Universitas 21
