= Holocene extinction =

Ongoing extinction event caused by human activity

External videos
- Are We Living in the Sixth Extinction? on YouTube
- We need IMMEDIATE action to stop extinction crisis, David Attenborough – BBC on YouTube
- Earth currently experiencing a sixth mass extinction, according to scientists on YouTube

The percentage of marine animal extinction at the genus level through the six mass extinctions

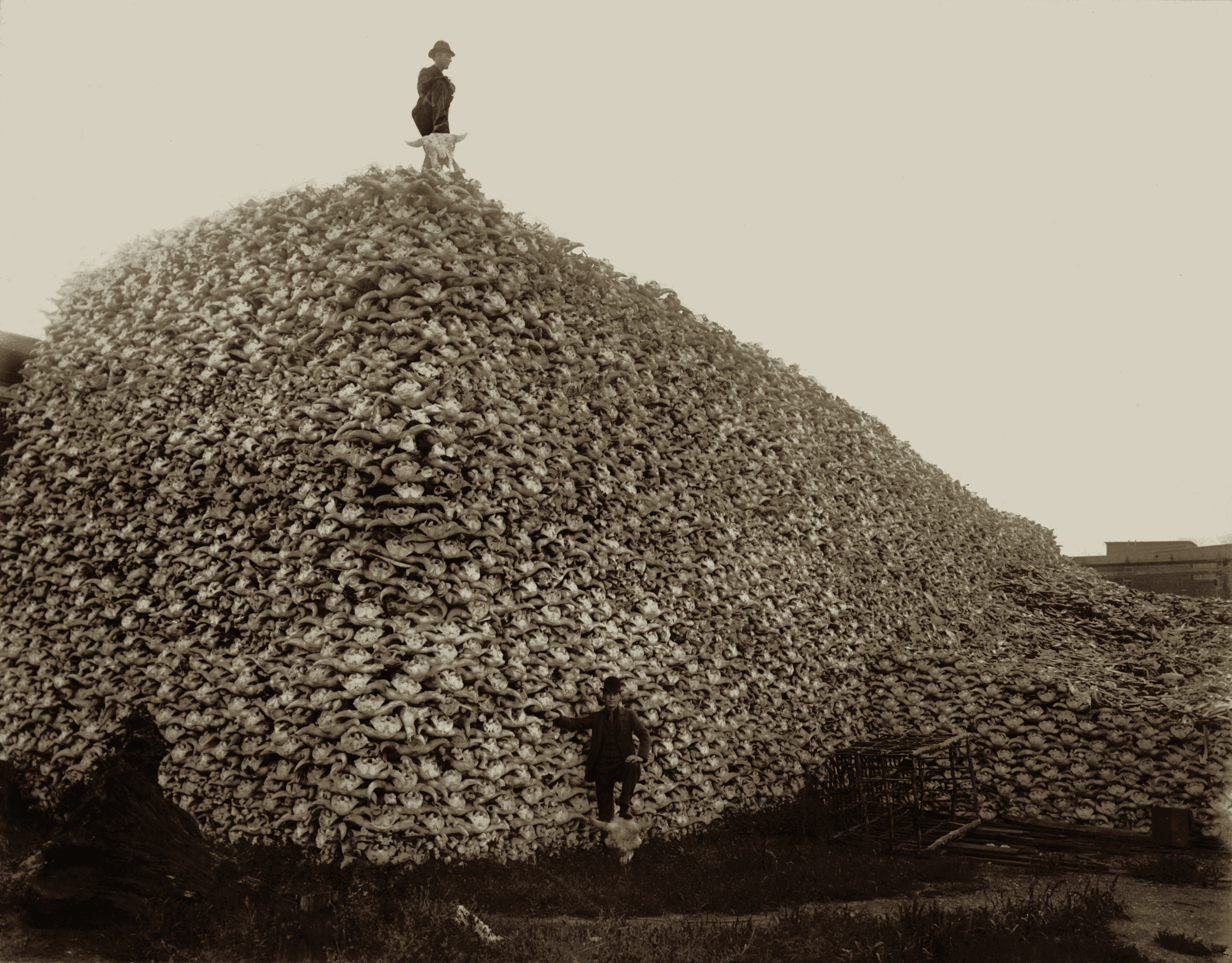
Two men next to a pile of American bison skulls awaiting industrial processing and conversion into fertilizer in the United States, in 1892.

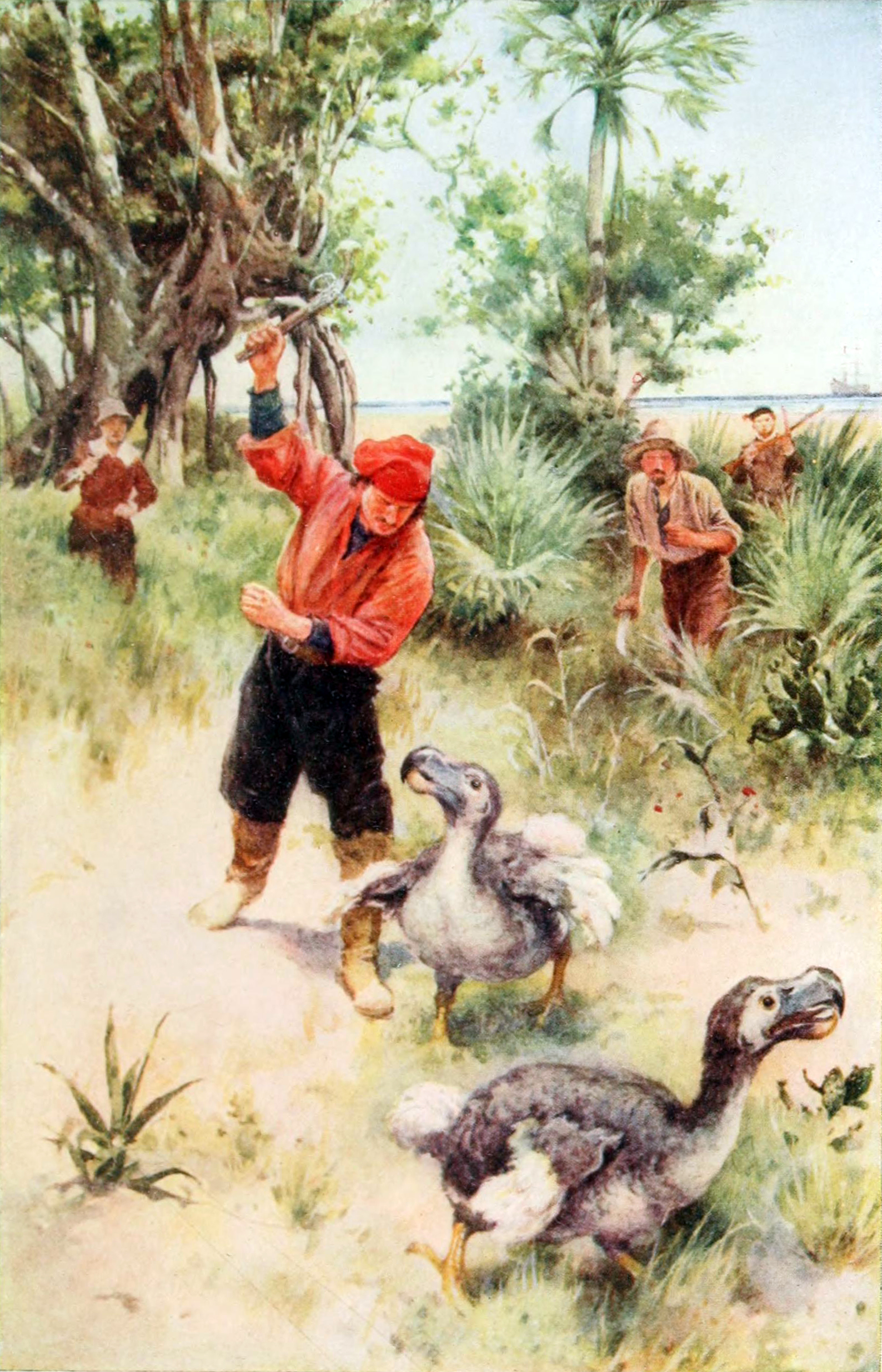
The dodo became extinct during the mid-to-late 17th century due to habitat destruction, overhunting, and predation by introduced mammals. It is an often-cited example of a human-driven extinction.

The Holocene or Anthropocene extinction is an ongoing extinction event caused by human activity during the current geological epoch, impacting diverse families of plants and animals, including mammals, birds, reptiles, amphibians, fish, and invertebrates, as well as both terrestrial and marine species. It is sometimes also called the sixth extinction (Note: Attributed to multiple sources:) (though this can also describe the Capitanian).

Current extinction rates are estimated at 100 to 1,000 times higher than natural background extinction rates. (Note: Attributed to multiple sources:) The Holocene extinction was preceded by the Late Pleistocene extinctions at the end of the last ice age (to which human activity also likely contributed) and the extinctions caused by Polynesian expansion.

The Holocene extinction continues into the 21st century, driven by anthropogenic climate change, destruction of wetlands, deforestation, overfishing, ocean acidification, human population growth, (Note: Attributed to multiple sources:) economic growth, and increasing consumption, particularly among affluent societies. Factors such as rising meat production (Note: Attributed to multiple sources:) and the destruction of critical habitats compound these issues. Other drivers include overexploitation of natural resources, pollution, and climate change-induced shifts in ecosystems.

Major extinction events during this period have been recorded across all continents, including Africa, Asia, Europe, Australia, North and South America, and various islands.

== Overview ==
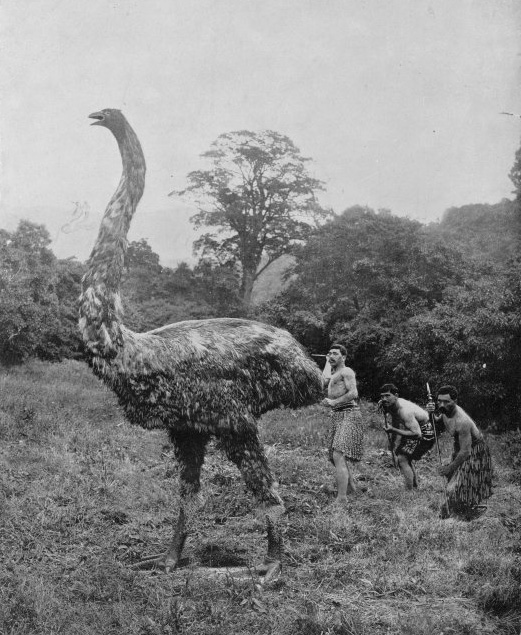
The moa (here reconstructed in a mock hunt) went extinct in the mid 15th century due to overhunting and habitat destruction by the Māori people; prior to the arrival of humans a century earlier, New Zealand was uninhabited by mammals

Mass extinctions are characterized by the loss of at least 75% of species within a geologically short period of time (i.e., less than 2 million years). The Holocene is the current geological epoch.

The precise timing of the Holocene extinction event remains debated, with no clear consensus on when it began or whether it should be considered distinct from the Quaternary extinction event. However, most scientists agree that human activities are the primary driver of the Holocene extinction. A 1998 survey conducted by the American Museum of Natural History found that 70% of biologists acknowledged an ongoing anthropogenic extinction event. Some researchers suggested that the activities of earlier archaic humans may have contributed to earlier extinctions, especially in Australia, New Zealand, and Madagascar. Even modest hunting pressure, combined with the vulnerability of large animals on isolated islands, is thought to have been enough to wipe out entire species. Only in the more recent stages of the Holocene have plants suffered extensive losses, which are also linked to human activities such as deforestation and land conversion.

=== Extinction rate ===
The contemporary rate of extinction is estimated at 100 to 1,000 times higher than the natural background extinction rate—the typical rate of species loss through natural evolutionary processes. One estimation suggested the rate could be as high as 10,000 times the background extinction rate, though this figure remains controversial. Theoretical ecologist Stuart Pimm has noted that the extinction rate for plants alone is 100 times higher than normal.

While some argue that the current extinction rates have not yet reached the catastrophic levels of past mass extinctions, Barnosky et al. (2011) and Hull et al. (2015) points out that extinction rates during past mass extinctions cannot be fully determined because of gaps in the fossil record. The former acknowledge that "the recent loss of species is dramatic and serious" but it does not "yet qualify as a mass extinction in the palaeontological sense of the Big Five". Estimates of species lost per year vary widely—from 1.5 to 40,000 species—but all indicate that human activity is driving this crisis.

In The Future of Life (2002), biologist Edward Osborne Wilson predicted that, if current trend continues, half of Earth's higher lifeforms could be extinct by 2100. More recent studies further support this view. A 2015 study on Hawaiian snails suggested that up to 7% of Earth's species may already be extinct. A 2021 study also found that only around 3% of the planet's terrestrial surface remains ecologically and faunally intact—areas that still have healthy populations of native species and minimal human footprint. A 2022 study suggests that if global warming continues, between 13% and 27% of terrestrial vertebrate species could be driven to extinction by 2100, with habitat destructions and co-extinctions accounting for the rest.

The 2019 Global Assessment Report on Biodiversity and Ecosystem Services, published by the United Nations IPBES, estimated that about one million species are currently at risk of extinction within decades because of human activities. Organized human existence is jeopardised by increasingly rapid destruction of the systems that support life on Earth, according to the report, the result of one of the most comprehensive studies of the health of the planet ever conducted. Moreover, the 2021 Economics of Biodiversity review, published by the UK government, asserts that "biodiversity is declining faster than at any time in human history." According to a 2022 study published in Frontiers in Ecology and the Environment, a survey of more than 3,000 experts says that the extent of the mass extinction might be greater than previously thought, and estimates that roughly 30% of species "have been globally threatened or driven extinct since the year 1500". In a 2022 report, IPBES listed unsustainable fishing, hunting, and logging as some of the primary drivers of the global extinction crisis.

A 2023 study published in PLOS One shows that around two million species are threatened with extinction, double the estimate put forward in the 2019 IPBES report. According to a 2023 study published in PNAS, at least 73 genera of animals have gone extinct since 1500. If humans had never existed, the study estimates it would have taken 18,000 years for the same genera to have disappeared naturally, leading the authors to conclude that "the current generic extinction rates are 35 times higher than expected background rates prevailing in the last million years under the absence of human impacts" and that human civilization is causing the "rapid mutilation of the tree of life".

=== Attribution ===
We are currently, in a systematic manner, exterminating all non-human living beings.

— Anne Larigauderie, IPBES executive secretary

There is widespread consensus among scientists that human activities—especially habitat destruction, resource consumption, and the elimination of species—are the main drivers of the current extinction crisis. Rising extinction rates among mammals, birds, reptiles, amphibians, and other groups have led many scientists to declare a global biodiversity crisis.

=== Scientific debate ===
World human population since 1800 in billions. Data from the United Nations projections in 2019.

The description of recent extinction as a mass extinction has been debated among scientists. Stuart Pimm, for example, asserts that the sixth mass extinction "is something that hasn't happened yet—we are on the edge of it." Several studies posit that the Earth has entered a sixth mass extinction event, including a 2015 paper by Barnosky et al. and a November 2017 statement titled "World Scientists' Warning to Humanity: A Second Notice", led by eight authors and signed by 15,364 scientists from 184 countries which asserted, among other things, that "we have unleashed a mass extinction event, the sixth in roughly 540 million years, wherein many current life forms could be extirpated or at least committed to extinction by the end of this century." The World Wide Fund for Nature's 2020 Living Planet Report says that wildlife populations have declined by 68% since 1970 as a result of overconsumption, population growth, and intensive farming, which is further evidence that humans have unleashed a sixth mass extinction event; however, this finding has been disputed by one 2020 study, which posits that this major decline was primarily driven by a few extreme outlier populations, and that when these outliers are removed, the trend shifts to that of a decline between the 1980s and 2000s, but a roughly positive trend after 2000. The 2020 study has been criticized for methodological flaws and for "downplaying biodiversity loss". A 2021 report in Frontiers in Conservation Science which cites both of the aforementioned studies, says "population sizes of vertebrate species that have been monitored across years have declined by an average of 68% over the last five decades, with certain population clusters in extreme decline, thus presaging the imminent extinction of their species," and asserts "that we are already on the path of a sixth major extinction is now scientifically undeniable." A January 2022 review article published in Biological Reviews builds upon previous studies documenting biodiversity decline to assert that a sixth mass extinction event caused by anthropogenic activity is currently under way. A December 2022 study published in Science Advances states that "the planet has entered the sixth mass extinction" and warns that current anthropogenic trends, particularly regarding climate and land-use changes, could result in the loss of more than a tenth of plant and animal species by the end of the century. 12% of all bird species are threatened with extinction. A 2023 study published in Biological Reviews found that, of 70,000 monitored species, some 48% are experiencing population declines from anthropogenic pressures, whereas only 3% have increasing populations.

According to the UNDP's 2020 Human Development Report, The Next Frontier: Human Development and the Anthropocene:

The planet's biodiversity is plunging, with a quarter of species facing extinction, many within decades. Numerous experts believe we are living through, or on the cusp of, a mass species extinction event, the sixth in the history of the planet and the first to be caused by a single organism—us.

The 2022 Living Planet Report found that vertebrate wildlife populations have plummeted by an average of almost 70% since 1970, with agriculture and fishing being the primary drivers of this decline.

Some scientists, including Rodolfo Dirzo and Paul R. Ehrlich, contend that the sixth mass extinction is largely unknown to most people globally and is also misunderstood by many in the scientific community. They say it is not the disappearance of species, which gets the most attention, that is at the heart of the crisis, but "the existential threat of myriad population extinctions".

=== Anthropocene ===
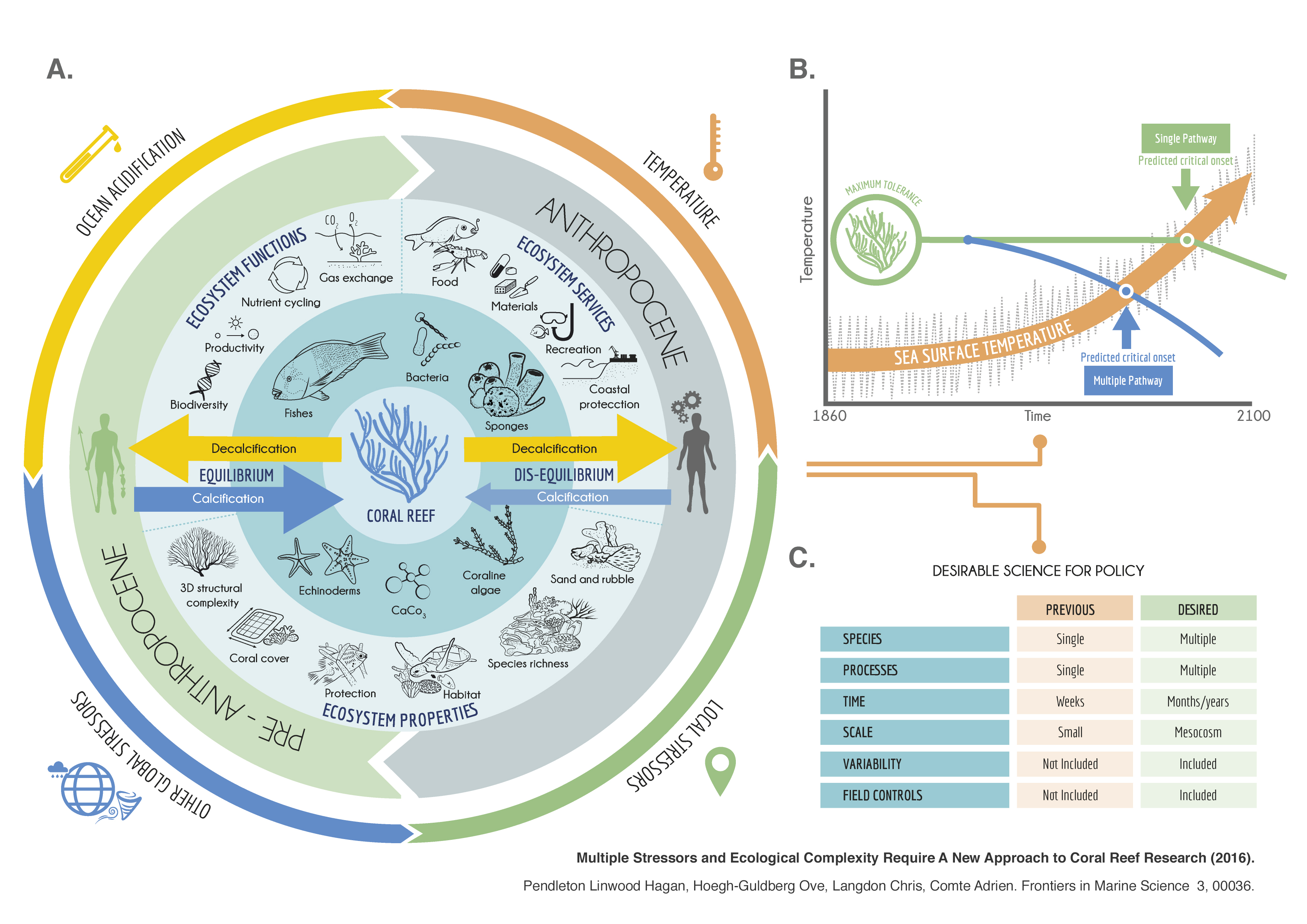
A diagram showing the ecological processes of coral reefs before and during the Anthropocene

The abundance of species extinctions considered anthropogenic, or due to human activity, has sometimes (especially when referring to hypothesized future events) been collectively called the "Anthropocene extinction". Anthropocene is a term introduced in 2000. Some now postulate that a new geological epoch has begun, with the most abrupt and widespread extinction of species since the Cretaceous–Paleogene extinction event 66 million years ago.

The term "anthropocene" is being used more frequently by scientists, and some commentators may refer to the current and projected future extinctions as part of a longer Holocene extinction. The Holocene–Anthropocene boundary is contested, with some commentators asserting significant human influence on climate for much of what is normally regarded as the Holocene Epoch. Some experts mark the transition from the Holocene to the Anthropocene at the onset of the industrial revolution. They also note that the official use of this term in the near future will heavily rely on its usefulness, especially for Earth scientists studying late Holocene periods.

It has been suggested that human activity has made the period starting from the mid-20th century different enough from the rest of the Holocene to consider it a new geological epoch, known as the Anthropocene, a term which was considered for inclusion in the timeline of Earth's history by the International Commission on Stratigraphy in 2016, but the proposal was rejected in 2024. To constitute the Holocene as an extinction event, scientists must determine exactly when anthropogenic greenhouse gas emissions began to measurably alter natural atmospheric levels on a global scale, and when these alterations caused changes to global climate. Using chemical proxies from Antarctic ice cores, researchers have estimated the fluctuations of carbon dioxide (CO_{2}) and methane (CH_{4}) gases in the Earth's atmosphere during the Late Pleistocene and Holocene epochs. Estimates of the fluctuations of these two gases in the atmosphere, using chemical proxies from Antarctic ice cores, generally indicate that the peak of the Anthropocene occurred within the previous two centuries: typically beginning with the Industrial Revolution, when the highest greenhouse gas levels were recorded.

=== Human ecology ===
A 2015 article in Science suggested that humans are unique in ecology as an unprecedented "global superpredator", regularly preying on large numbers of fully grown terrestrial and marine apex predators, and with a great deal of influence over food webs and climatic systems worldwide. Although significant debate exists as to how much human predation and indirect effects contributed to prehistoric extinctions, certain population crashes have been directly correlated with human arrival. Human activity has been the main cause of mammalian extinctions since the Late Pleistocene. A 2018 study published in PNAS found that since the dawn of human civilization, the biomass of wild mammals has decreased by 83%. The biomass decrease is 80% for marine mammals, 50% for plants, and 15% for fish. Currently, livestock make up 60% of the biomass of all mammals on Earth, followed by humans (36%) and wild mammals (4%). As for birds, 70% are domesticated, such as poultry, whereas only 30% are wild.

== Historic extinction ==
=== Human activity ===
==== Activities contributing to extinctions ====
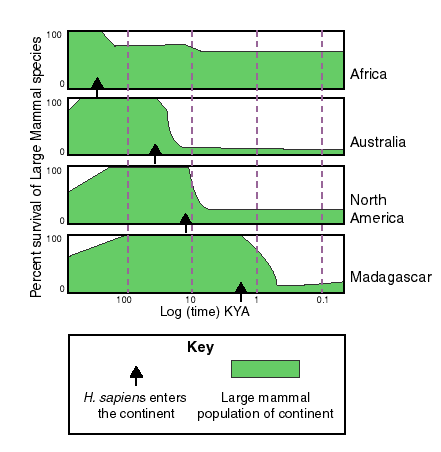
The percentage of megafauna on different land masses over time, with the arrival of humans indicated.

Extinction of animals, plants, and other organisms caused by human actions may go as far back as the late Pleistocene, over 12,000 years ago. There is a correlation between megafaunal extinction and the arrival of humans. Megafauna that are still extant also suffered severe declines that were highly correlated with human expansion and activity. Over the past 125,000 years, the average body size of wildlife has fallen by 14% as actions by prehistoric humans eradicated megafauna on all continents with the exception of Africa. Over the past 130,000 years, avian functional diversity has declined precipitously and disproportionately relative to phylogenetic diversity losses.

Human civilization was founded on and grew from agriculture. The more land used for farming, the greater the population a civilization could sustain, and subsequent popularization of farming led to widespread habitat conversion.

Habitat destruction by humans, thus replacing the original local ecosystems, is a major driver of extinction. The sustained conversion of biodiversity rich forests and wetlands into poorer fields and pastures (of lesser carrying capacity for wild species), over the last 10,000 years, has considerably reduced the Earth's carrying capacity for wild birds and mammals, among other organisms, in both population size and species count.

Other, related human causes of the extinction event include deforestation, hunting, pollution, the introduction in various regions of non-native species, and the widespread transmission of infectious diseases spread through livestock and crops.

==== Agriculture and climate change ====
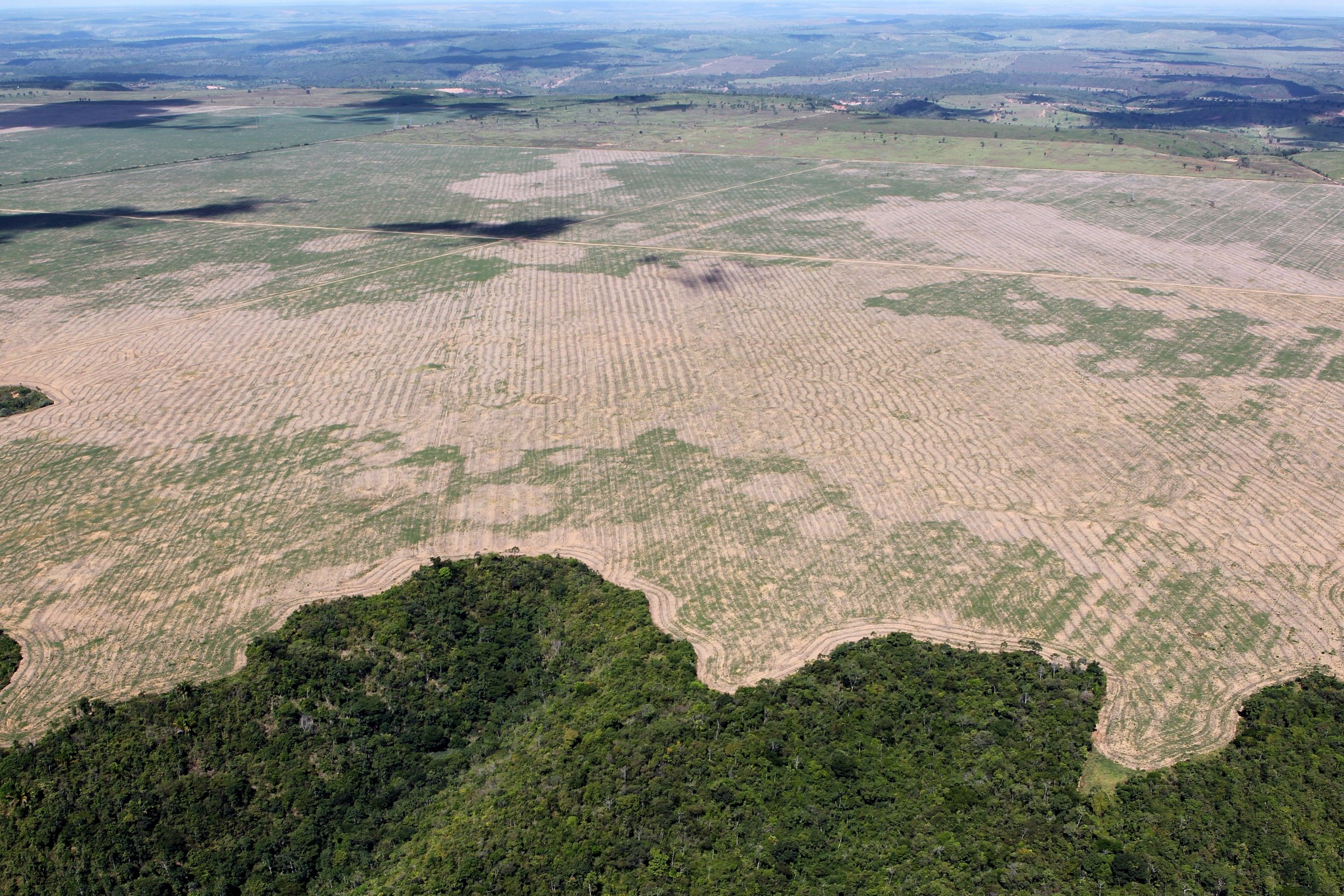
Deforestation in the Maranhão state, Brazil, in July 2016.

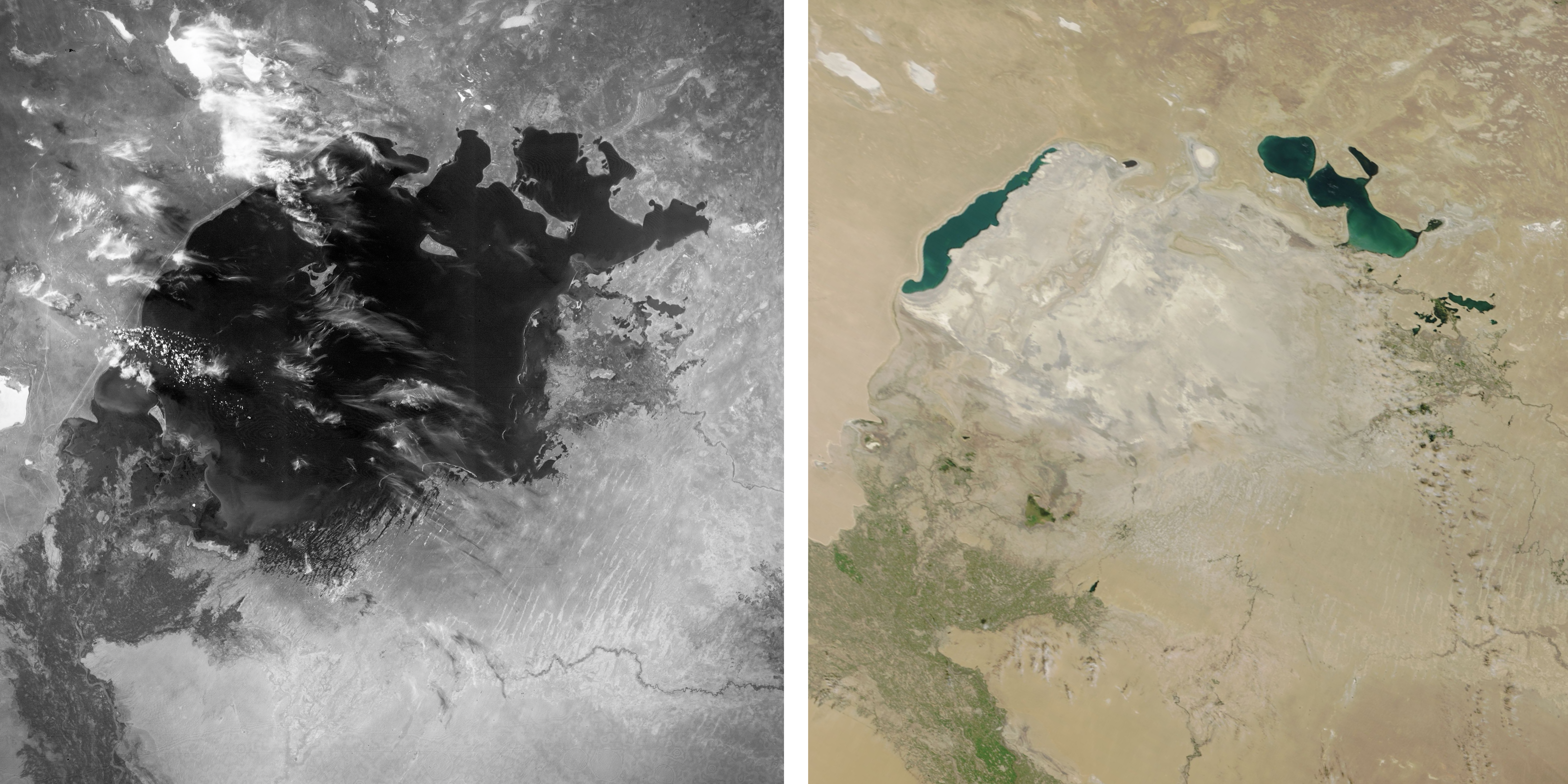
The irreversible destruction of the Aral Sea after the diversion of its rivers in an attempt by the Soviet Union to create cotton fields. It was formerly the third largest lake in the world.

Recent investigations into the practice of landscape burning during the Neolithic Revolution have a major implication for the current debate about the timing of the Anthropocene and the role that humans may have played in the production of greenhouse gases prior to the Industrial Revolution. Studies of early hunter-gatherers raise questions about the current use of population size or density as a proxy for the amount of land clearance and anthropogenic burning that took place in pre-industrial times. Scientists have questioned the correlation between population size and early territorial alterations. Ruddiman and Ellis' research paper in 2009 makes the case that early farmers involved in systems of agriculture used more land per capita than growers later in the Holocene, who intensified their labor to produce more food per unit of area (thus, per laborer); arguing that agricultural involvement in rice production implemented thousands of years ago by relatively small populations created significant environmental impacts through large-scale means of deforestation.

While a number of human-derived factors are recognized as contributing to rising atmospheric concentrations of CH_{4} (methane) and CO_{2} (carbon dioxide), deforestation and territorial clearance practices associated with agricultural development may have contributed most to these concentrations globally in earlier millennia. Scientists that are employing a variance of archaeological and paleoecological data argue that the processes contributing to substantial human modification of the environment spanned many thousands of years on a global scale and thus, not originating as late as the Industrial Revolution. Palaeoclimatologist William Ruddiman has argued that in the early Holocene 11,000 years ago, atmospheric carbon dioxide and methane levels fluctuated in a pattern which was different from the Pleistocene epoch before it. He argued that the patterns of the significant decline of CO_{2} levels during the last ice age of the Pleistocene inversely correlate to the Holocene where there have been dramatic increases of CO_{2} around 8000 years ago and CH_{4} levels 3000 years after that. The correlation between the decrease of CO_{2} in the Pleistocene and the increase of it during the Holocene implies that the causation of this spark of greenhouse gases into the atmosphere was the growth of human agriculture during the Holocene.

=== Climate change ===
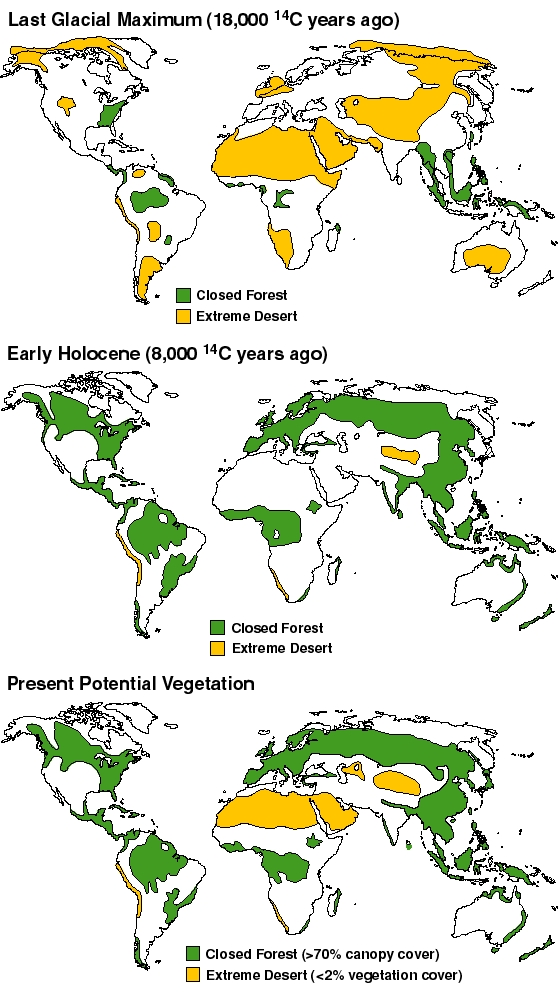
Top: Arid ice age climate Middle: Atlantic period, warm and wet Bottom: Potential vegetation in climate now if not for human effects like agriculture.

One of the main theories explaining early Holocene extinctions is historic climate change. The climate change theory has suggested that a change in climate near the end of the late Pleistocene stressed the megafauna to the point of extinction. Some scientists favor abrupt climate change as the catalyst for the extinction of the megafauna at the end of the Pleistocene, most who believe increased hunting from early modern humans also played a part, with others even suggesting that the two interacted. In the Americas, a controversial explanation for the shift in climate is presented under the Younger Dryas impact hypothesis, which states that the impact of comets cooled global temperatures. Despite its popularity among nonscientists, this hypothesis has never been accepted by relevant experts, who dismiss it as a fringe theory.

== Contemporary extinction ==
=== History ===
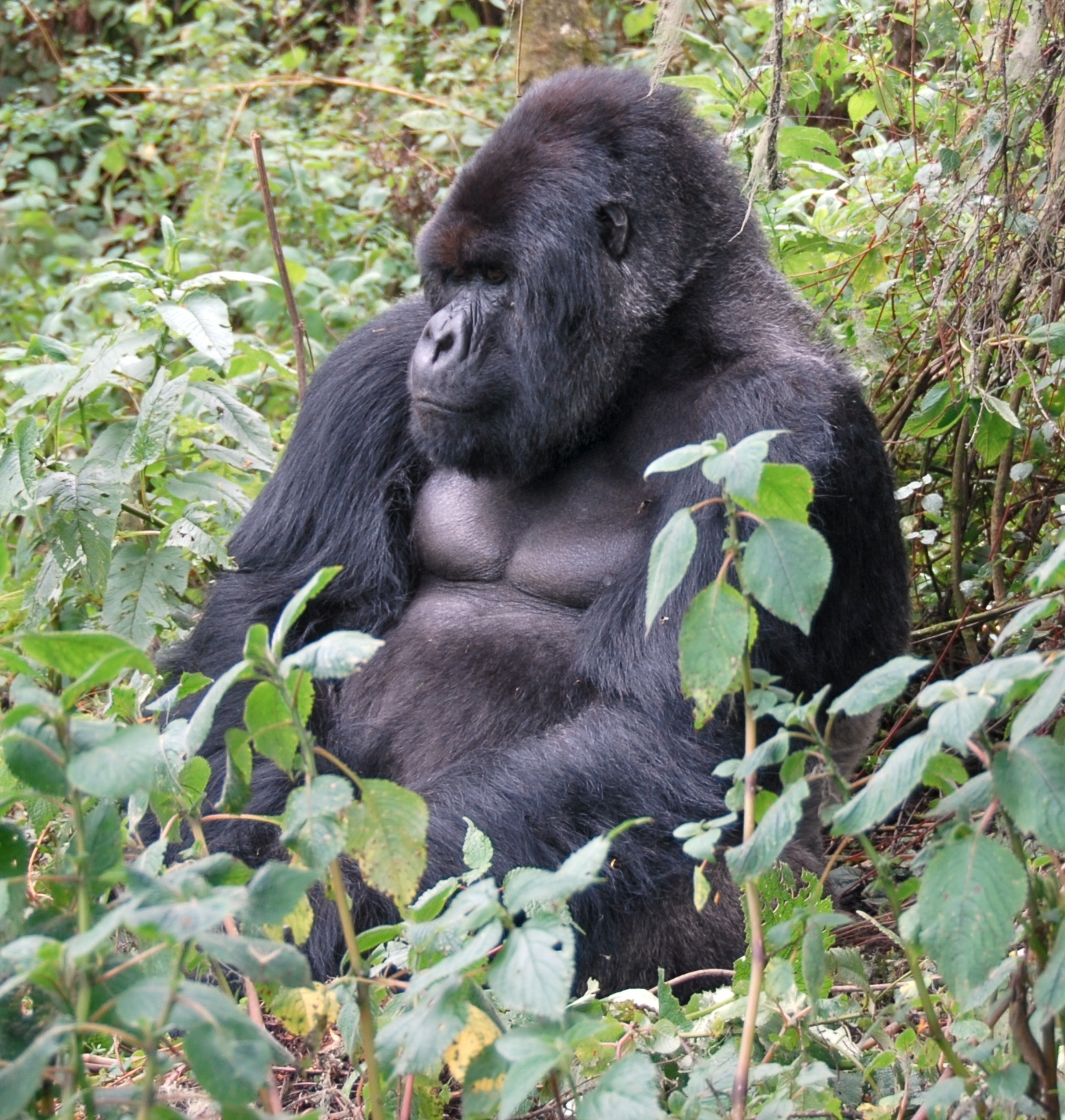
There are roughly 1,000 mountain gorillas remaining. 60% of primate species face an anthropogenically driven extinction crisis and 75% have declining populations.

Contemporary human overpopulation and continued population growth, along with economic growth and per-capita consumption growth, prominently in the past two centuries, are regarded as the underlying causes of extinction. Inger Andersen, the executive director of the United Nations Environment Programme, stated that "we need to understand that the more people there are, the more we put the Earth under heavy pressure. As far as biodiversity is concerned, we are at war with nature."

Some scholars assert that the emergence of capitalism as the dominant economic system has accelerated ecological exploitation and destruction, and has also exacerbated mass species extinction. CUNY professor David Harvey, for example, posits that the neoliberal era "happens to be the era of the fastest mass extinction of species in the Earth's recent history". Ecologist William E. Rees concludes that the "neoliberal paradigm contributes significantly to planetary unraveling" by treating the economy and the ecosphere as totally separate systems, and by neglecting the latter. Major lobbying organizations representing corporations in the agriculture, fisheries, forestry and paper, mining, and oil and gas industries, including the United States Chamber of Commerce, have been pushing back against legislation that could address the extinction crisis. A 2022 report by the climate think tank InfluenceMap stated that "although industry associations, especially in the US, appear reluctant to discuss the biodiversity crisis, they are clearly engaged on a wide range of policies with significant impacts on biodiversity loss."

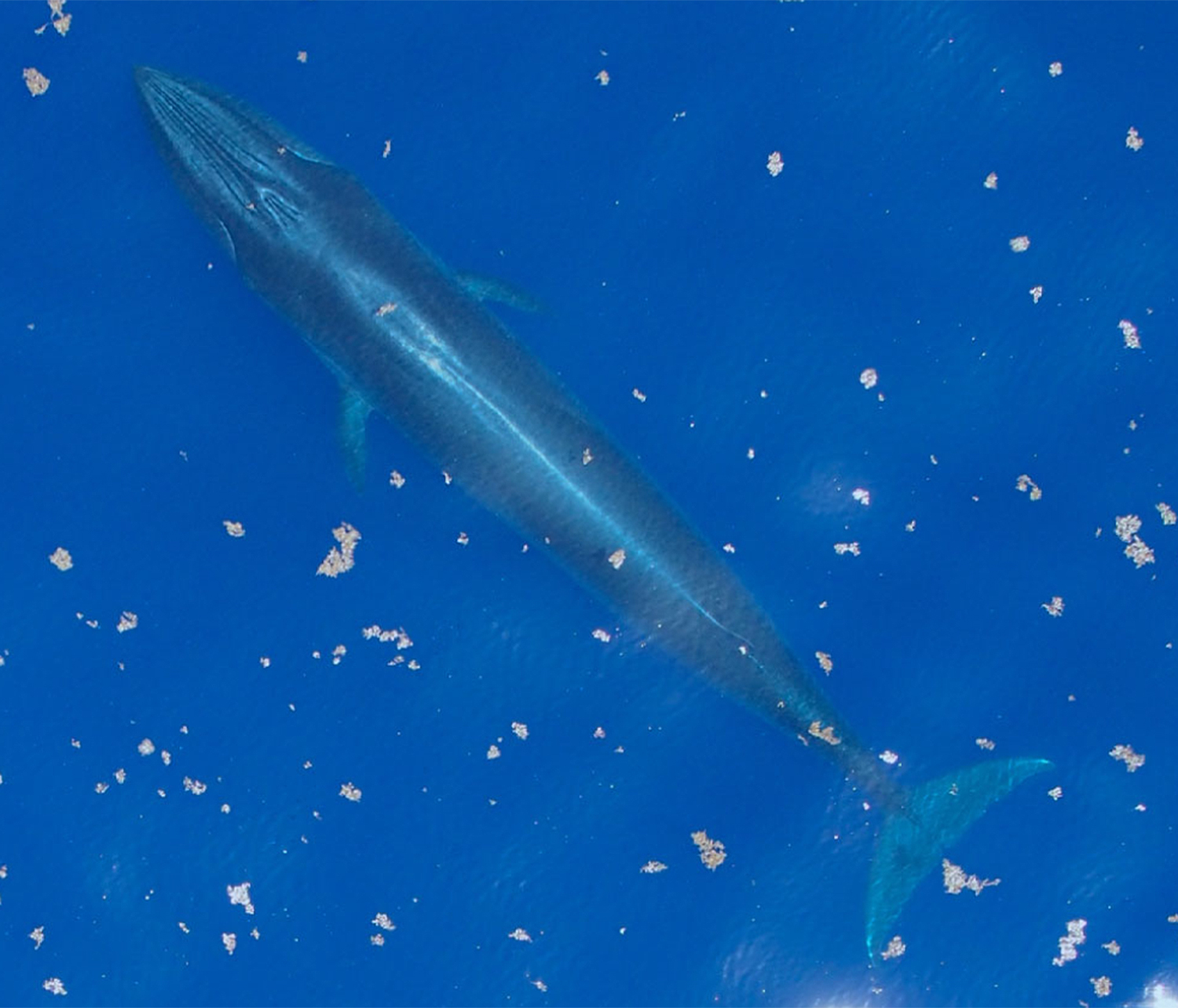
Rice's whale faces possible extinction following the US government’s removal of protections for the species in 2026. There are only 51 left.

The loss of animal species from ecological communities, defaunation, is primarily driven by human activity. This has resulted in empty forests, ecological communities depleted of large vertebrates. This is not to be confused with extinction, as it includes both the disappearance of species and declines in abundance. Defaunation effects were first implied at the Symposium of Plant-Animal Interactions at the University of Campinas, Brazil in 1988 in the context of Neotropical forests. Since then, the term has gained broader usage in conservation biology as a global phenomenon.

Big cat populations have severely declined over the last half-century and could face extinction in the following decades. According to 2011 IUCN estimates: lions are down to 25,000, from 450,000; leopards are down to 50,000, from 750,000; cheetahs are down to 12,000, from 45,000; tigers are down to 3,000 in the wild, from 50,000. A December 2016 study by the Zoological Society of London, Panthera Corporation and Wildlife Conservation Society showed that cheetahs are far closer to extinction than previously thought, with only 7,100 remaining in the wild, existing within only 9% of their historic range. Human pressures are to blame for the cheetah population crash, including prey loss due to overhunting by people, retaliatory killing from farmers, habitat loss and the illegal wildlife trade. Populations of brown bears have experienced similar population decline.

The term pollinator decline refers to the reduction in abundance of insect and other animal pollinators in many ecosystems worldwide beginning at the end of the twentieth century, and continuing into the present day. Pollinators, which are necessary for 75% of food crops, are declining globally in both abundance and diversity. A 2017 study led by Radboud University's Hans de Kroon indicated that the biomass of insect life in Germany had declined by three-quarters in the previous 25 years. Participating researcher Dave Goulson of Sussex University stated that their study suggested that humans are making large parts of the planet uninhabitable for wildlife. Goulson characterized the situation as an approaching "ecological Armageddon", adding that "if we lose the insects then everything is going to collapse." A 2019 study found that over 40% of insect species are threatened with extinction. The most significant drivers in the decline of insect populations are associated with intensive farming practices, along with pesticide use and climate change. The world's insect population decreases by around 1 to 2% per year.

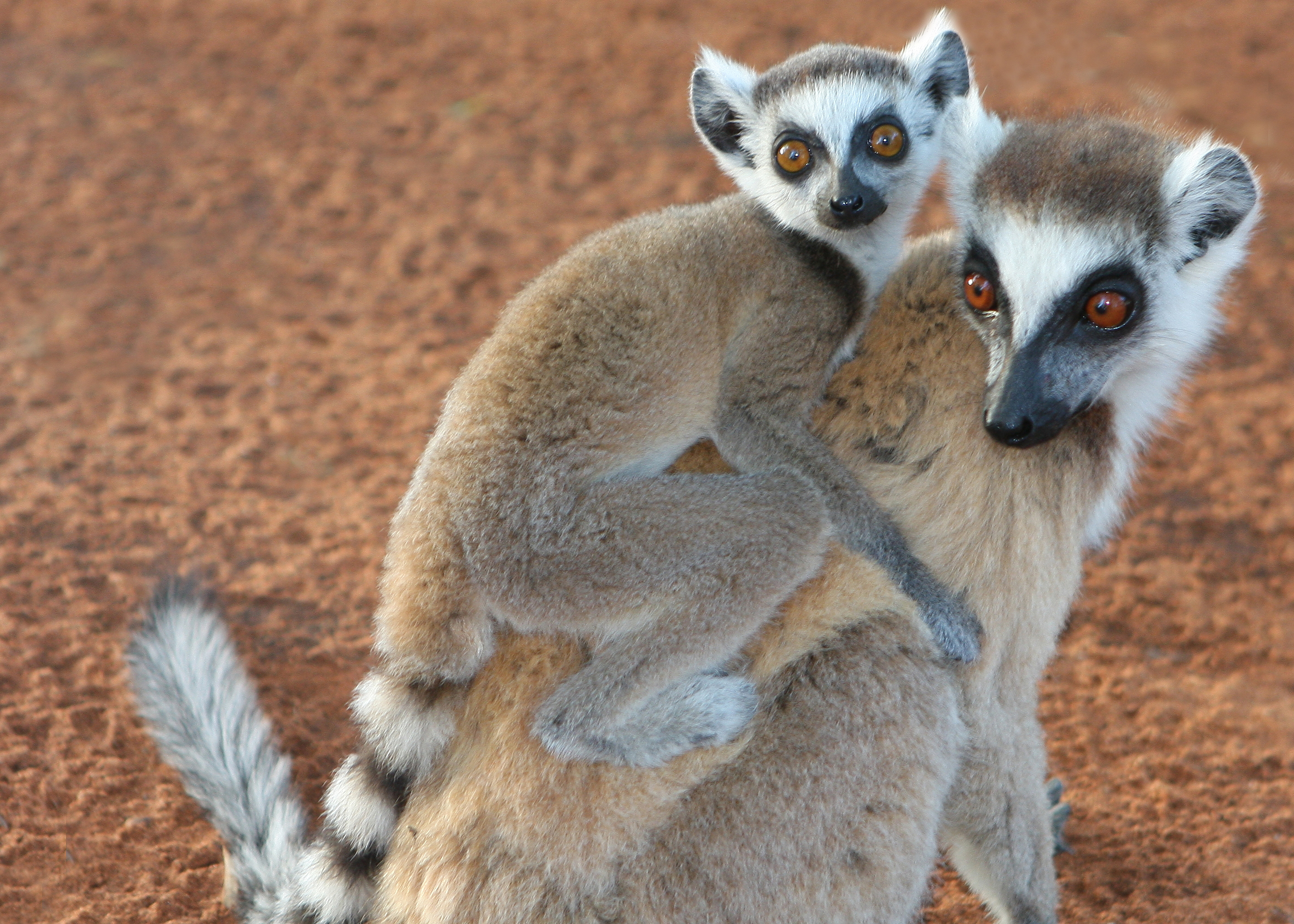
The ring-tailed lemur, one of the more than 120 unique species of mammals only found on Madagascar threatened with extinction.

We have driven the rate of biological extinction, the permanent loss of species, up several hundred times beyond its historical levels, and are threatened with the loss of a majority of all species by the end of the 21st century.

— Peter Raven, former president of the American Association for the Advancement of Science (AAAS), in the foreword to their publication AAAS Atlas of Population and Environment

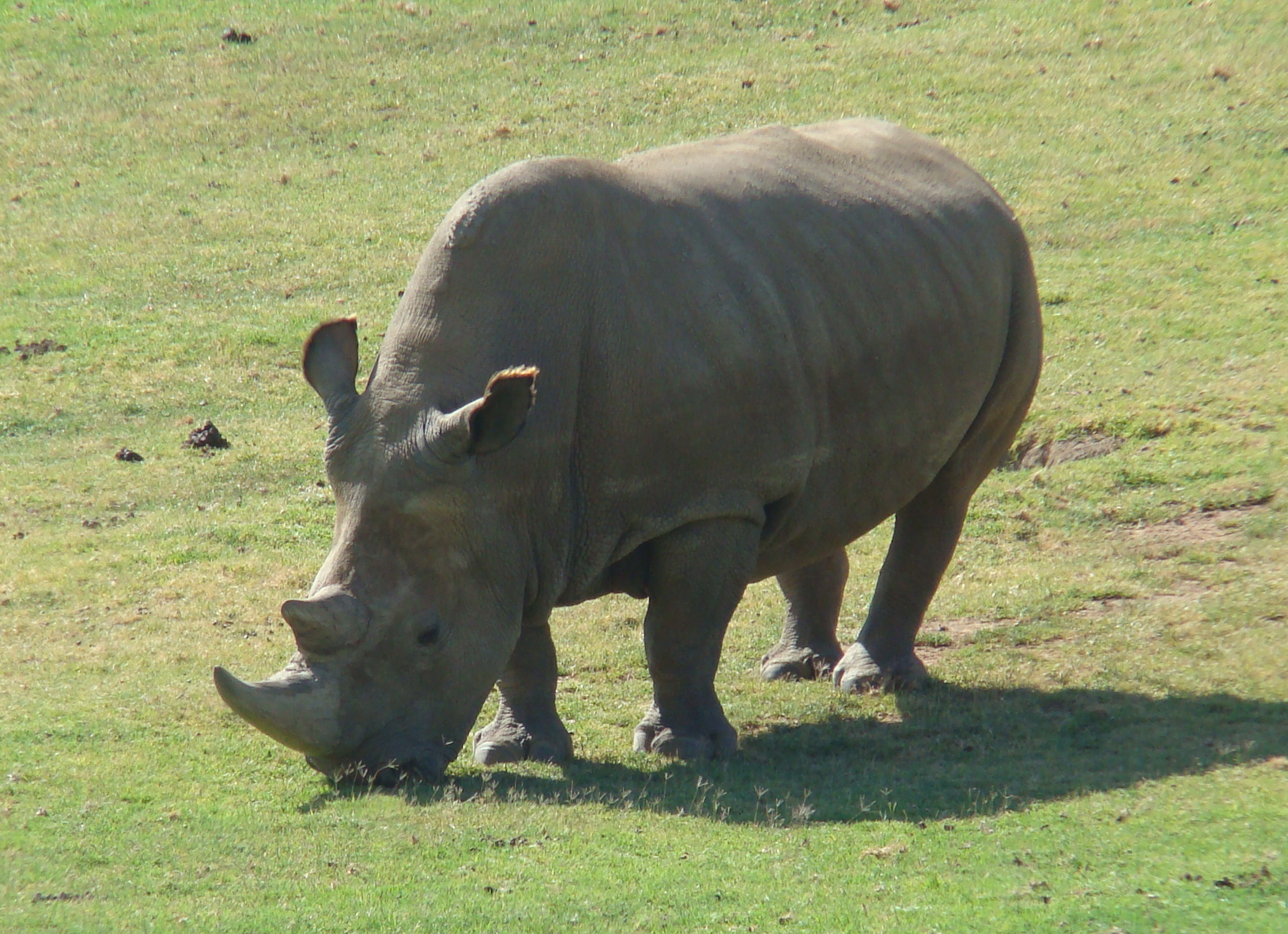
Angalifu, a male northern white rhinoceros at the San Diego Zoo Safari Park (died December 2014). Sudan, the last male of the subspecies, died on March 19, 2018.

Various species are predicted to become extinct in the near future, among them some species of rhinoceros, primates, and pangolins. Others, including several species of giraffe, are considered "vulnerable" and are experiencing significant population declines from anthropogenic impacts including hunting, deforestation and conflict. Hunting alone threatens bird and mammalian populations around the world. The direct killing of megafauna for meat and body parts is the primary driver of their destruction, with 70% of the 362 megafauna species in decline as of 2019. Mammals in particular have suffered such severe losses as the result of human activity (mainly during the Quaternary extinction event, but partly during the Holocene) that it could take several million years for them to recover. Contemporary assessments have discovered that roughly 41% of amphibians, 25% of mammals, 21% of reptiles and 14% of birds are threatened with extinction, which could disrupt ecosystems on a global scale and eliminate billions of years of phylogenetic diversity. 189 countries, which are signatory to the Convention on Biological Diversity (Rio Accord), have committed to preparing a Biodiversity Action Plan, a first step at identifying specific endangered species and habitats, country by country.

For the first time since the demise of the dinosaurs 65 million years ago, we face a global mass extinction of wildlife. We ignore the decline of other species at our peril—for they are the barometer that reveals our impact on the world that sustains us.

— Mike Barrett, director of science and policy at WWF's UK branch

A 2023 study published in Current Biology concluded that current biodiversity loss rates could reach a tipping point and inevitably trigger a total ecosystem collapse.

=== Recent extinction ===
Share of species threatened with extinction as of 2019.

Recent extinctions are more directly attributable to human influences, whereas prehistoric extinctions can be attributed to other factors. The International Union for Conservation of Nature (IUCN) characterizes 'recent' extinction as those that have occurred past the cut-off point of 1500, and at least 875 plant and animal species have gone extinct since that time and 2009. Some species, such as the Père David's deer and the Hawaiian crow, are extinct in the wild, and survive solely in captive populations. Other populations are only locally extinct (extirpated), still existent elsewhere, but reduced in distribution, as with the extinction of gray whales in the Atlantic, and of the leatherback sea turtle in Malaysia.

Since the Late Pleistocene, humans (together with other factors) have been rapidly driving the largest vertebrate animals towards extinction, and in the process interrupting a 66-million-year-old feature of ecosystems, the relationship between diet and body mass, which researchers suggest could have unpredictable consequences. A 2019 study published in Nature Communications found that rapid biodiversity loss is impacting larger mammals and birds to a much greater extent than smaller ones, with the body mass of such animals expected to shrink by 25% over the next century. Another 2019 study published in Biology Letters found that extinction rates are perhaps much higher than previously estimated, in particular for bird species.

The 2019 Global Assessment Report on Biodiversity and Ecosystem Services lists the primary causes of contemporary extinctions in descending order: (1) changes in land and sea use (primarily agriculture and overfishing respectively); (2) direct exploitation of organisms such as hunting; (3) anthropogenic climate change; (4) pollution and (5) invasive alien species spread by human trade. This report, along with the 2020 Living Planet Report by the WWF, both project that climate change will be the leading cause in the next several decades.

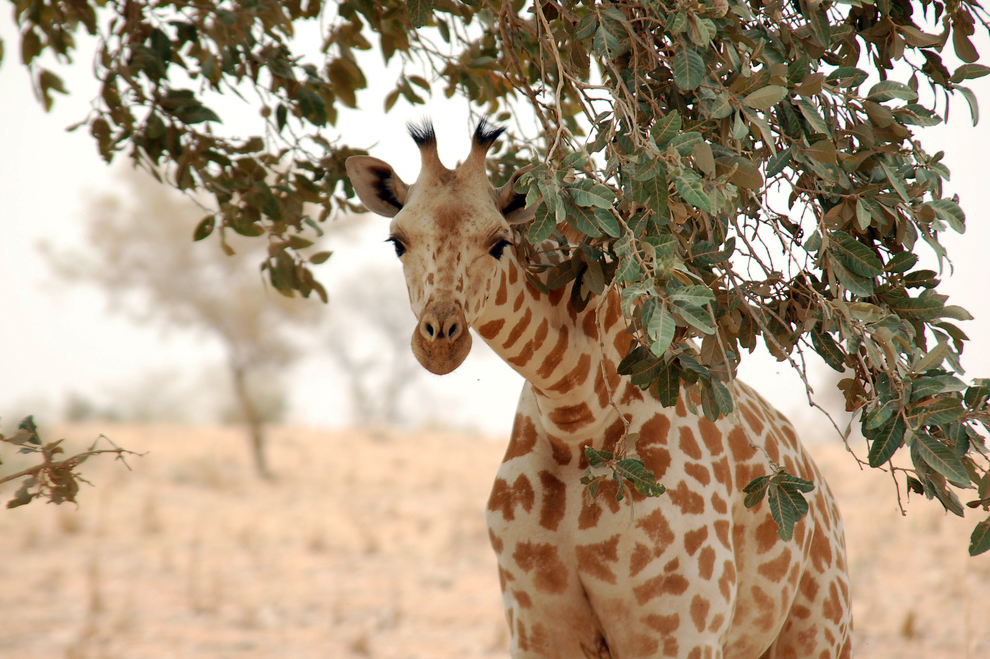
As of 2023, giraffes have been driven to extinction in seven countries.

A June 2020 study published in PNAS posits that the contemporary extinction crisis "may be the most serious environmental threat to the persistence of civilization, because it is irreversible" and that its acceleration "is certain because of the still fast growth in human numbers and consumption rates." The study found that more than 500 vertebrate species are poised to be lost in the next two decades.

=== Habitat destruction ===
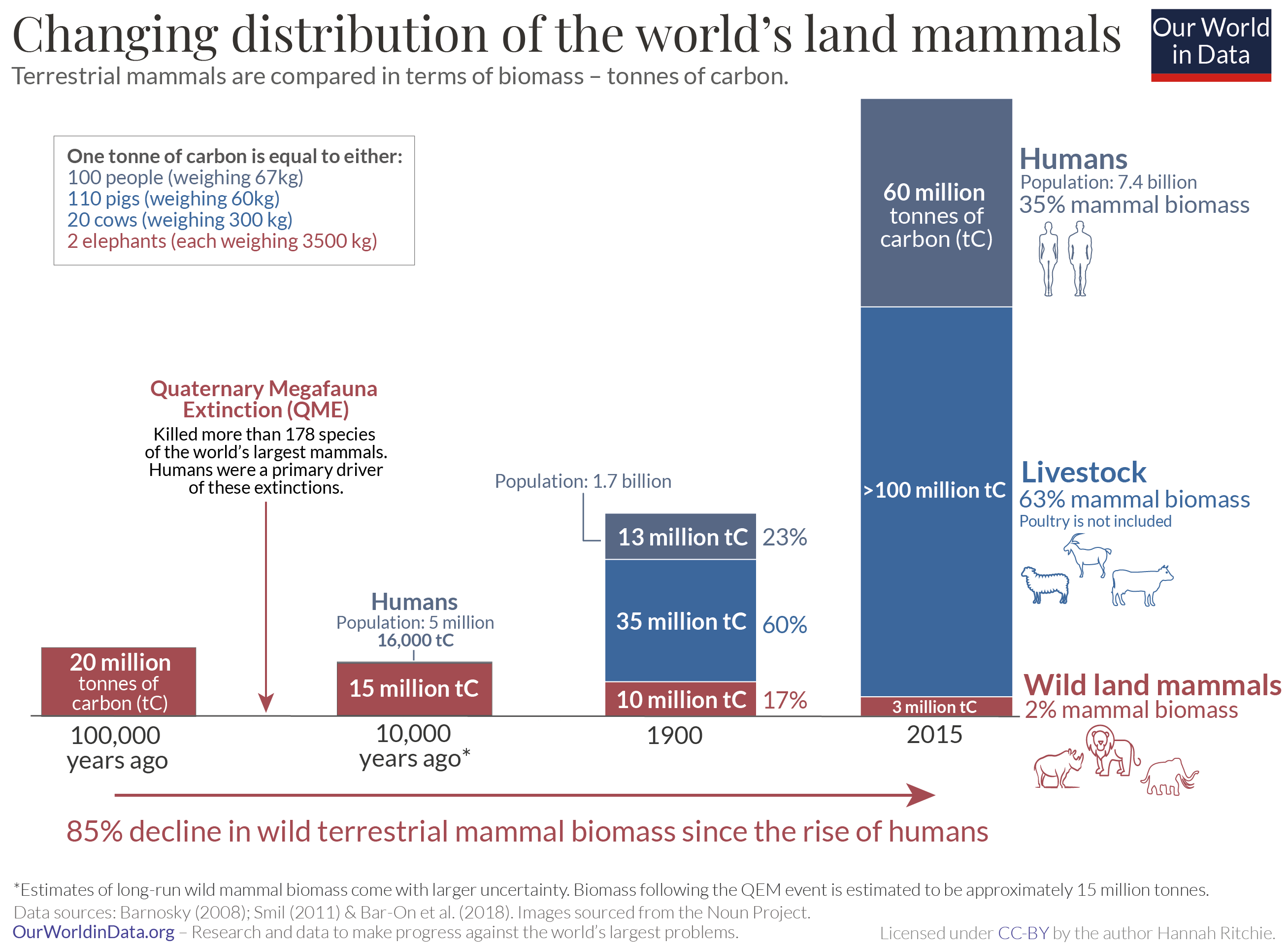
The changing distribution of the world's land mammals in tonnes of carbon. The biomass of wild land mammals has declined by 85% since the emergence of humans.

Humans both create and destroy crop cultivar and domesticated animal varieties. Advances in transportation and industrial farming has led to monoculture and the extinction of many cultivars. The use of certain plants and animals for food has also resulted in their extinction, including silphium and the passenger pigeon. It was estimated in 2012 that 13% of Earth's ice-free land surface is used as row-crop agricultural sites, 26% used as pastures, and 4% urban-industrial areas.

In March 2019, Nature Climate Change published a study by ecologists from Yale University, who found that over the next half century, human land use will reduce the habitats of 1,700 species by up to 50%, pushing them closer to extinction. That same month PLOS Biology published a similar study drawing on work at the University of Queensland, which found that "more than 1,200 species globally face threats to their survival in more than 90% of their habitat and will almost certainly face extinction without conservation intervention".

Since 1970, the populations of migratory freshwater fish have declined by 76%, according to research published by the Zoological Society of London in July 2020. Overall, around one in three freshwater fish species are threatened with extinction due to human-driven habitat degradation and overfishing.

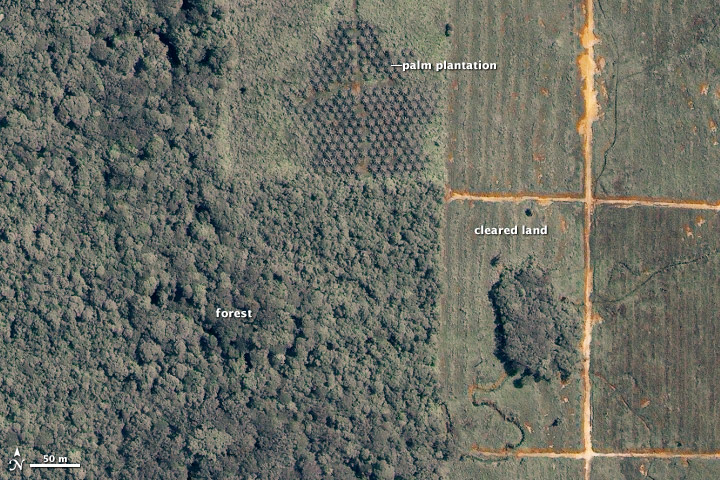
Satellite image of rainforest converted to oil palm plantations.

Some scientists and academics assert that industrial agriculture and the growing demand for meat is contributing to significant global biodiversity loss as this is a significant driver of deforestation and habitat destruction; species-rich habitats, such as the Amazon region and Indonesia being converted to agriculture. A 2017 study by the World Wildlife Fund (WWF) found that 60% of biodiversity loss can be attributed to the vast scale of feed crop cultivation required to rear tens of billions of farm animals. Moreover, a 2006 report by the Food and Agriculture Organization (FAO) of the United Nations, Livestock's Long Shadow, also found that the livestock sector is a "leading player" in biodiversity loss. More recently, in 2019, the IPBES Global Assessment Report on Biodiversity and Ecosystem Services attributed much of this ecological destruction to agriculture and fishing, with the meat and dairy industries having a very significant impact. Since the 1970s food production has soared to feed a growing human population and bolster economic growth, but at a huge price to the environment and other species. The report says some 25% of the Earth's ice-free land is used for cattle grazing. A 2020 study published in Nature Communications warned that human impacts from housing, industrial agriculture and in particular meat consumption are wiping out a combined 50 billion years of Earth's evolutionary history (defined as phylogenetic diversity (Note: Phylogenetic diversity (PD) is the sum of the phylogenetic branch lengths in years connecting a set of species to each other across their phylogenetic tree, and measures their collective contribution to the tree of life.)) and driving to extinction some of the "most unique animals on the planet," among them the Aye-aye lemur, the Chinese crocodile lizard and the pangolin. Said lead author Rikki Gumbs:

We know from all the data we have for threatened species, that the biggest threats are agriculture expansion and the global demand for meat. Pasture land, and the clearing of rainforests for production of soy, for me, are the largest drivers—and the direct consumption of animals.

Urbanization has also been cited as a significant driver of biodiversity loss, particularly of plant life. A 1999 study of local plant extirpations in Great Britain found that urbanization contributed at least as much to local plant extinction as did agriculture.

=== Climate change ===
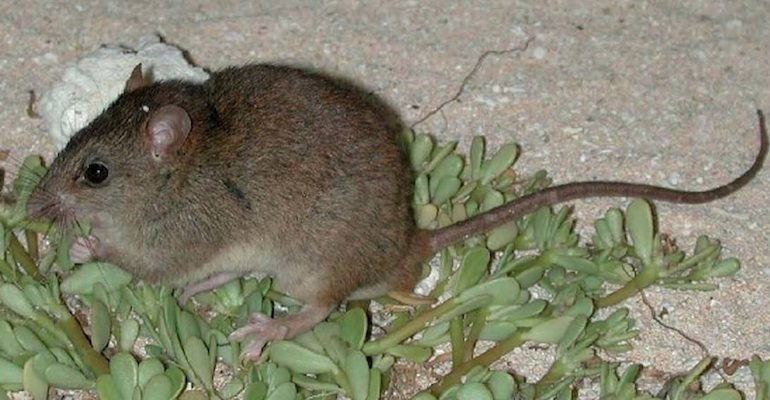
Bramble Cay melomys were declared extinct in June 2016. This is the first recorded mammalian extinction due to anthropogenic climate change.

Climate change is expected to be a major driver of extinctions from the 21st century. Rising levels of carbon dioxide are resulting in influx of this gas into the ocean, increasing its acidity. Marine organisms which possess calcium carbonate shells or exoskeletons experience physiological pressure as the carbonate reacts with acid. For example, this is already resulting in coral bleaching on various coral reefs worldwide, which provide valuable habitat and maintain a high biodiversity. Marine gastropods, bivalves, and other invertebrates are also affected, as are the organisms that feed on them. Some studies have suggested that it is not climate change that is driving the current extinction crisis, but the demands of contemporary human civilization on nature. However, a rise in average global temperatures greater than 5.2 °C is projected to cause a mass extinction similar to the "Big Five" mass extinction events of the Phanerozoic, even without other anthropogenic impacts on biodiversity.

=== Overexploitation ===
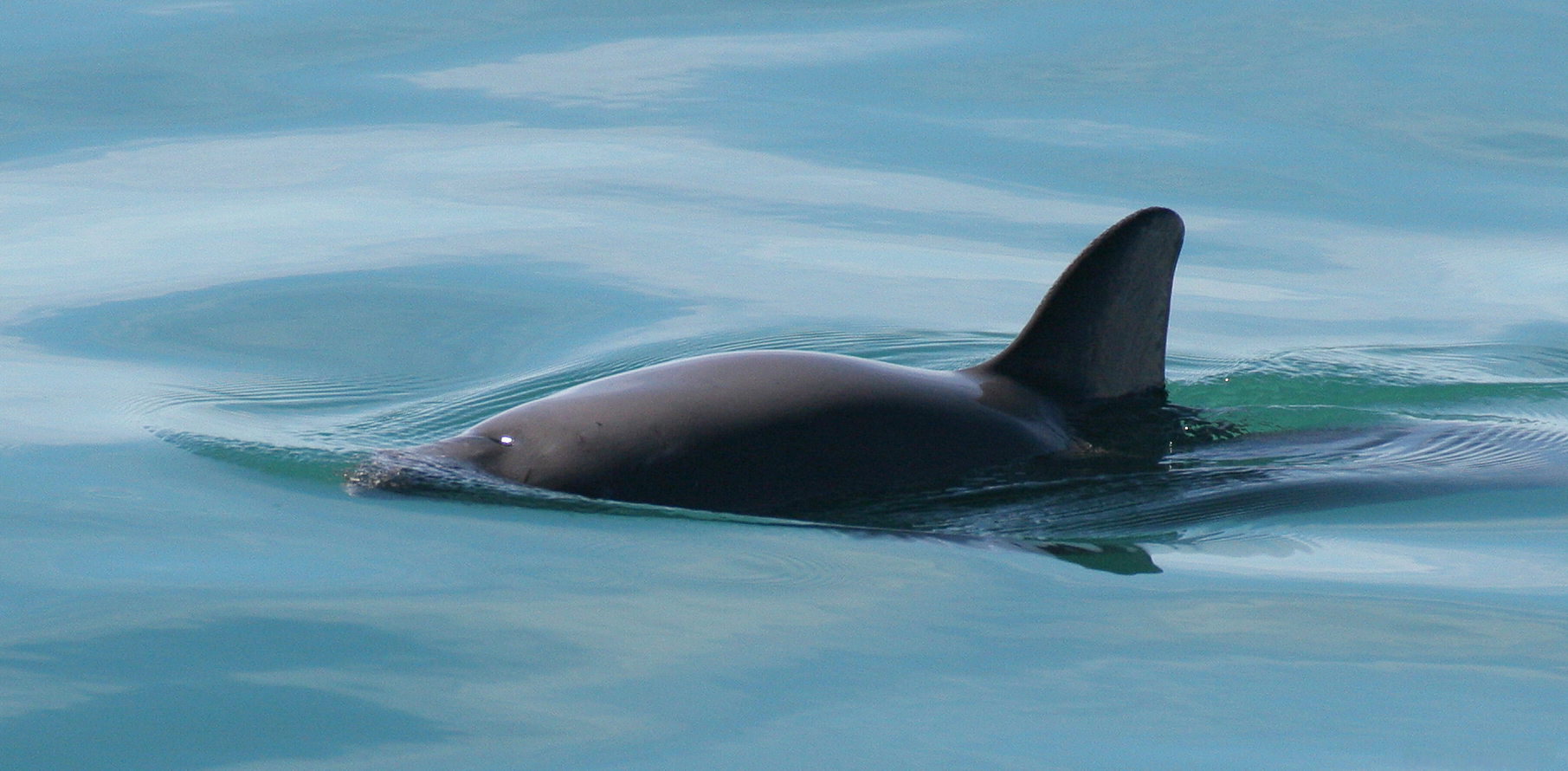
The vaquita, the world's most endangered marine mammal, was reduced to 30 individuals as of February 2017. They are often killed by commercial fishing nets. As of March 2019, only 10 remain, according to The International Committee for the Recovery of the Vaquita.

The collapse of the Atlantic northwest cod fishery as a result of overfishing, and subsequent recovery.

Overhunting can reduce the local population of game animals by more than half, as well as reducing population density, and may lead to extinction for some species. Populations located nearer to villages are significantly more at risk of depletion. Several conservationist organizations, among them IFAW and HSUS, assert that trophy hunters, particularly from the United States, are playing a significant role in the decline of giraffes, which they refer to as a "silent extinction".

The surge in the mass killings by poachers involved in the illegal ivory trade along with habitat loss is threatening African elephant populations. In 1979, their populations stood at 1.7 million; at present there are fewer than 400,000 remaining. Prior to European colonization, scientists believe Africa was home to roughly 20 million elephants. According to the Great Elephant Census, 30% of African elephants (or 144,000 individuals) disappeared over a seven-year period, 2007 to 2014. African elephants could become extinct by 2035 if poaching rates continue.

Decline in the number of African elephants since 1500 AD

Fishing has had a devastating effect on marine organism populations for several centuries even before the explosion of destructive and highly effective fishing practices like trawling. Humans are unique among predators in that they regularly prey on other adult apex predators, particularly in marine environments; bluefin tuna, blue whales, North Atlantic right whales, and over fifty species of sharks and rays are vulnerable to predation pressure from human fishing, in particular commercial fishing. A 2016 study published in Science concludes that humans tend to hunt larger species, and this could disrupt ocean ecosystems for millions of years. A 2020 study published in Science Advances found that around 18% of marine megafauna, including iconic species such as the Great white shark, are at risk of extinction from human pressures over the next century. In a worst-case scenario, 40% could go extinct over the same time period. According to a 2021 study published in Nature, 71% of oceanic shark and ray populations have been destroyed by overfishing (the primary driver of ocean defaunation) from 1970 to 2018, and are nearing the "point of no return" as 24 of the 31 species are now threatened with extinction, with several being classified as critically endangered. Almost two-thirds of sharks and rays around coral reefs are threatened with extinction from overfishing, with 14 of 134 species being critically endangered.

If this pattern goes unchecked, the future oceans would lack many of the largest species in today's oceans. Many large species play critical roles in ecosystems and so their extinctions could lead to ecological cascades that would influence the structure and function of future ecosystems beyond the simple fact of losing those species.

— Jonathan Payne, associate professor and chair of geological sciences at Stanford University

=== Disease ===
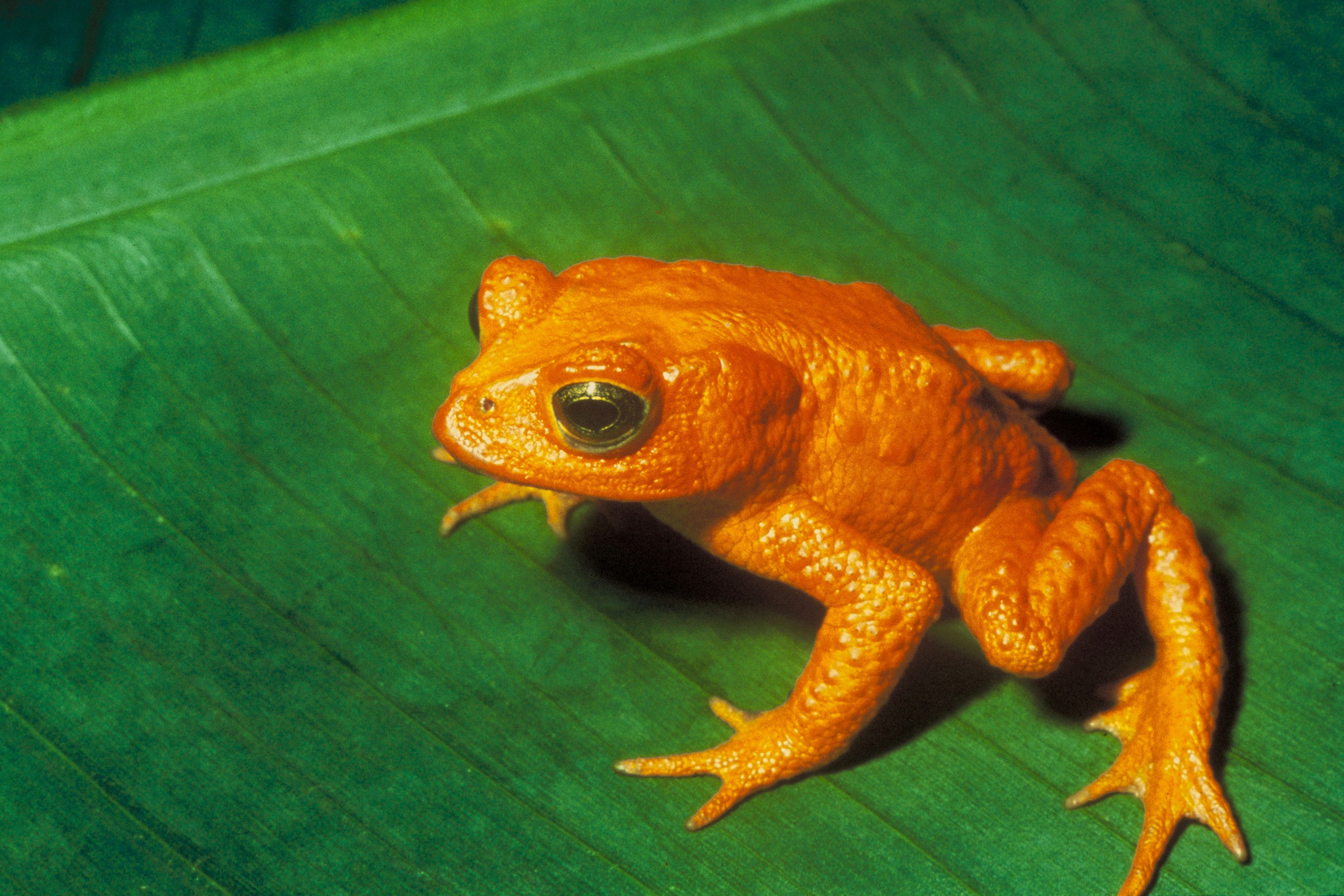
The golden toad of Costa Rica, extinct since around 1989. Its disappearance has been attributed to a confluence of several factors, including El Niño warming, fungus, habitat loss and the introduction of invasive species.

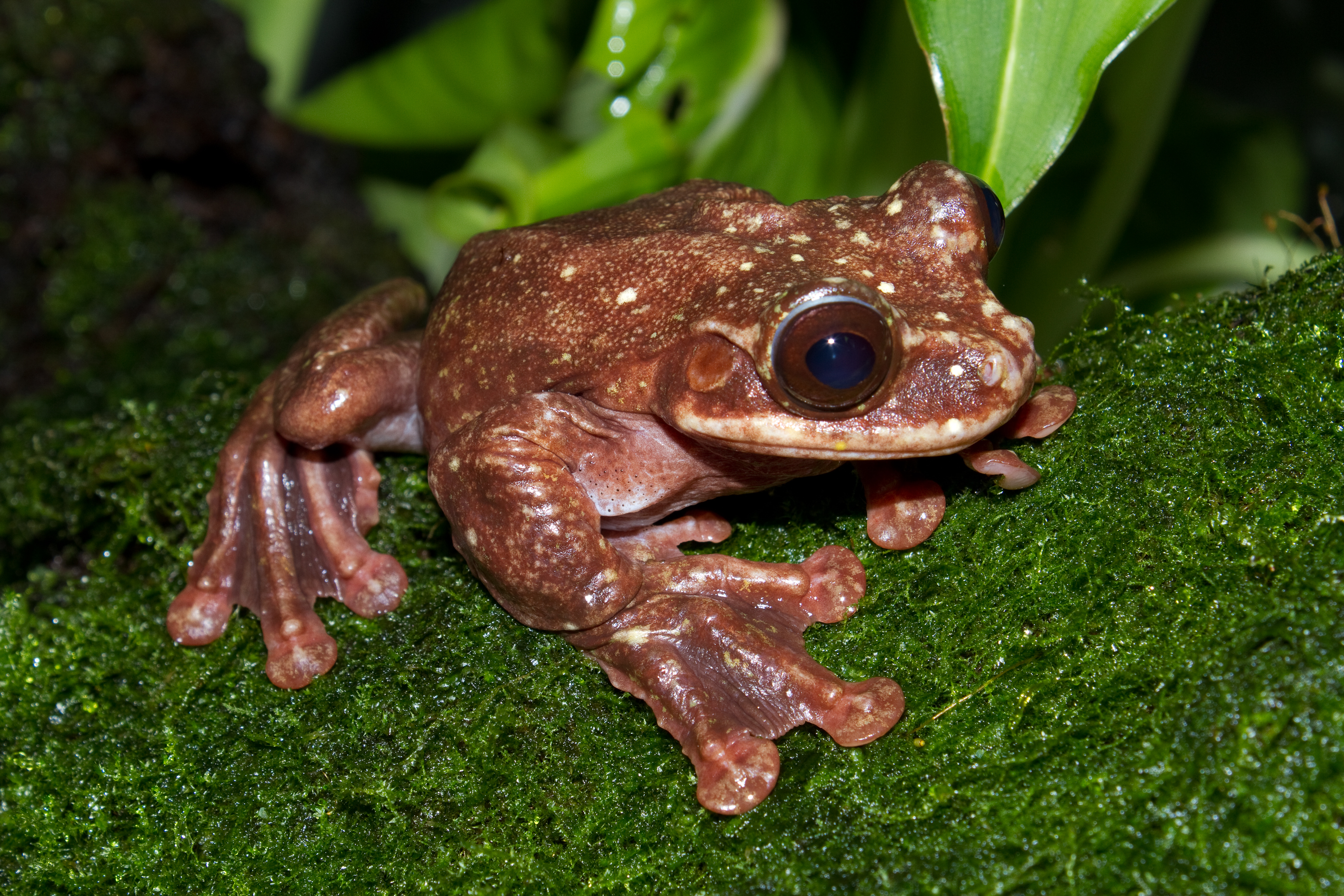
Toughie, the last Rabbs' fringe-limbed treefrog, died in September 2016. The species was killed off by the chytrid fungus Batrachochytrium dendrobatidis

The decline of amphibian populations has also been identified as an indicator of environmental degradation. As well as habitat loss, introduced predators and pollution, Chytridiomycosis, a fungal infection accidentally spread by human travel, globalization, and the wildlife trade, has caused severe population drops of over 500 amphibian species, and perhaps 90 extinctions, including (among many others) the extinction of the golden toad in Costa Rica, the gastric-brooding frog in Australia, Rabb's fringe-limbed treefrog and the extinction of the Panamanian golden frog in the wild. Chytrid fungus has spread across Australia, New Zealand, Central America and Africa, including countries with high amphibian diversity such as cloud forests in Honduras and Madagascar. Batrachochytrium salamandrivorans is a similar infection currently threatening salamanders. Amphibians are now the most endangered vertebrate group, having existed for more than 300 million years through three other mass extinctions.

Millions of bats in the US have been dying off since 2012 due to a fungal infection known as white-nose syndrome that spread from European bats, who appear to be immune. Population drops have been as great as 90% within five years, and extinction of at least one bat species is predicted. There is currently no form of treatment, and such declines have been described as "unprecedented" in bat evolutionary history by Alan Hicks of the New York State Department of Environmental Conservation.

Between 2007 and 2013, over ten million beehives were abandoned due to colony collapse disorder, which causes worker bees to abandon the queen. Though no single cause has gained widespread acceptance by the scientific community, proposals include infections with Varroa and Acarapis mites; malnutrition; various pathogens; genetic factors; immunodeficiencies; loss of habitat; changing beekeeping practices; or a combination of factors.

== By region ==
Megafauna were once found on every continent of the world, but are now almost exclusively found on the continent of Africa. In some regions, megafauna experienced population crashes and trophic cascades shortly after the earliest human settlers. Worldwide, 178 species of the world's largest mammals died out between 52,000 and 9,000 BC; it has been suggested that a higher proportion of African megafauna survived because they evolved alongside humans. The timing of South American megafaunal extinction appears to precede human arrival, although the possibility that human activity at the time impacted the global climate enough to cause such an extinction has been suggested.

=== Africa ===
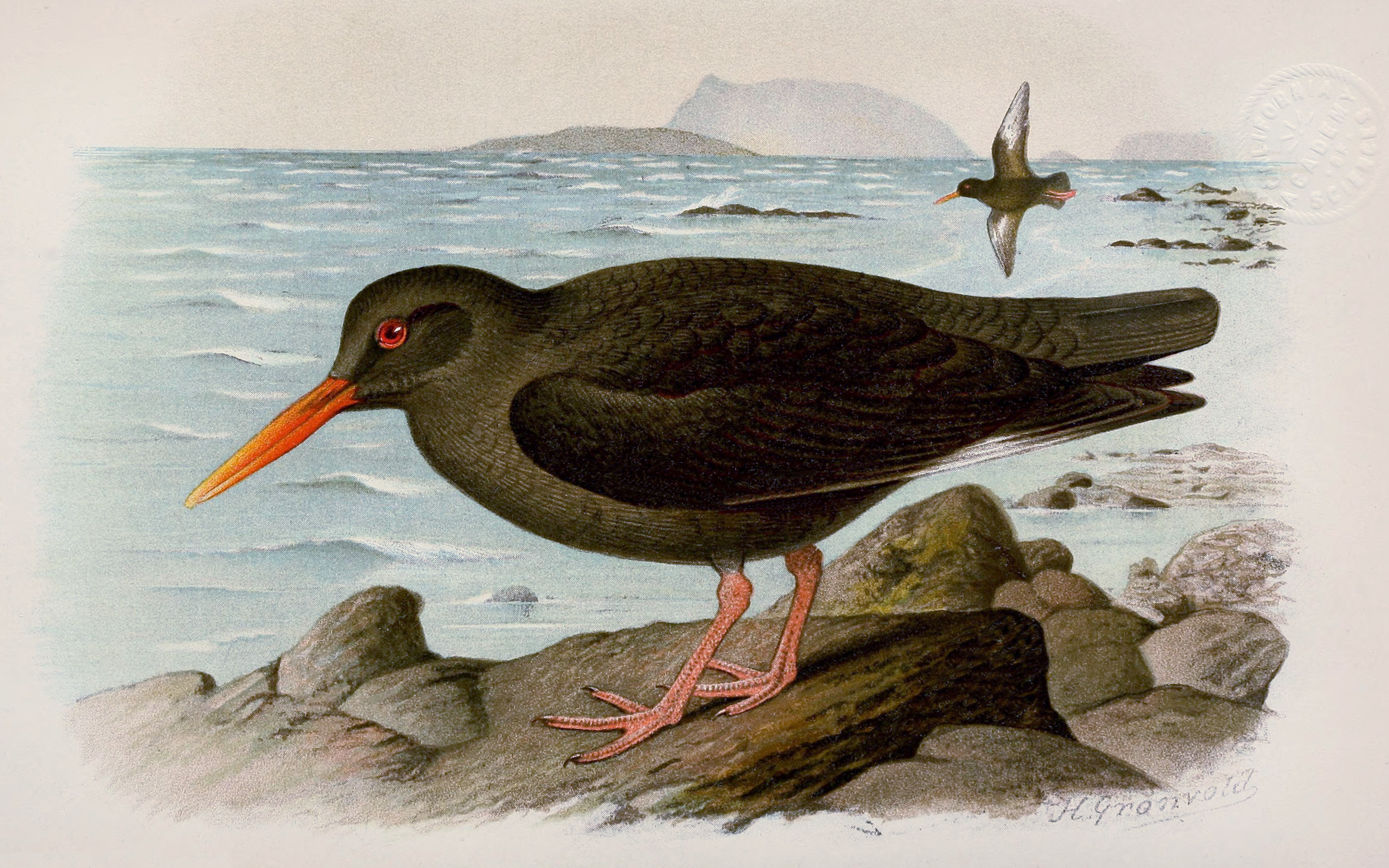
Illustration from 1914 of the Canary Islands oystercatcher, a species driven to extinction by humans in 1950.

Africa experienced the smallest decline in megafauna compared to the other continents. This is presumably due to the idea that African megafauna evolved alongside humans, and thus developed a healthy fear of them, unlike the comparatively tame animals of other continents.

=== Eurasia ===
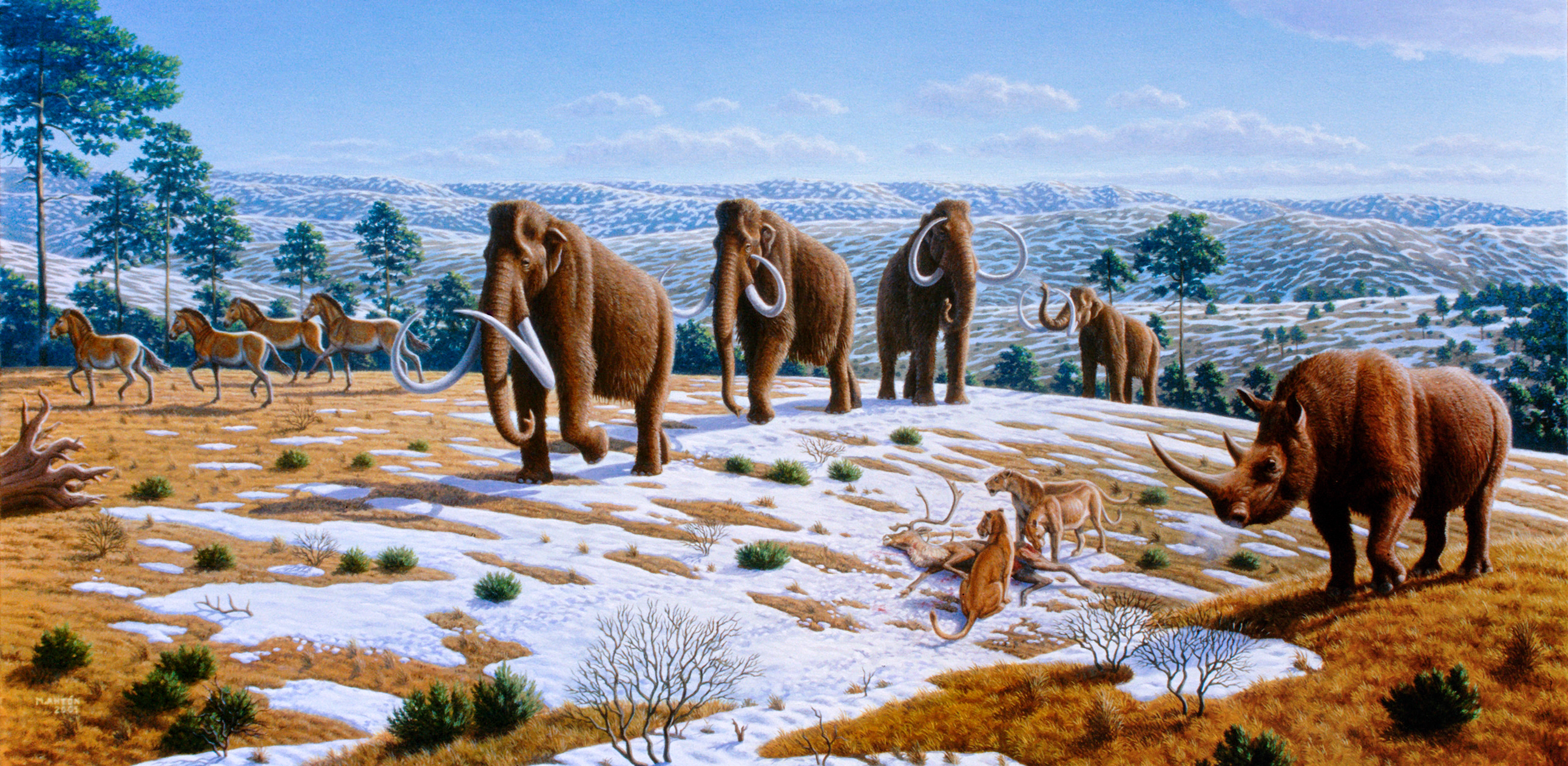
Many giant mammals such as woolly mammoths, woolly rhinoceroses, and cave lions inhabited the mammoth steppe during the Pleistocene.

Unlike other continents, the megafauna of Eurasia went extinct over a relatively long period of time, possibly due to climate fluctuations fragmenting and decreasing populations, leaving them vulnerable to over-exploitation, as with the steppe bison (Bison priscus). The warming of the arctic region caused the rapid decline of grasslands, which had a negative effect on the grazing megafauna of Eurasia. Most of what once was mammoth steppe was converted to mire, rendering the environment incapable of supporting them, notably the woolly mammoth. However, all these megafauna had survived previous interglacials with the same or more intense warming, suggesting that even during warm periods, refugia may have existed and that human hunting may have been the critical factor for their extinction.

In the western Mediterranean region, anthropogenic forest degradation began around 4,000 BP, during the Chalcolithic, and became especially pronounced during the Roman era. The reasons for the decline of forest ecosystems stem from agriculture, grazing, and mining. During the twilight years of the Western Roman Empire, forests in northwestern Europe rebounded from losses incurred throughout the Roman period, though deforestation on a large scale resumed once again around 800 BP, during the High Middle Ages.

In southern China, human land use is believed to have permanently altered the trend of vegetation dynamics in the region, which was previously governed by temperature. This is evidenced by high fluxes of charcoal from that time interval.

=== Americas ===
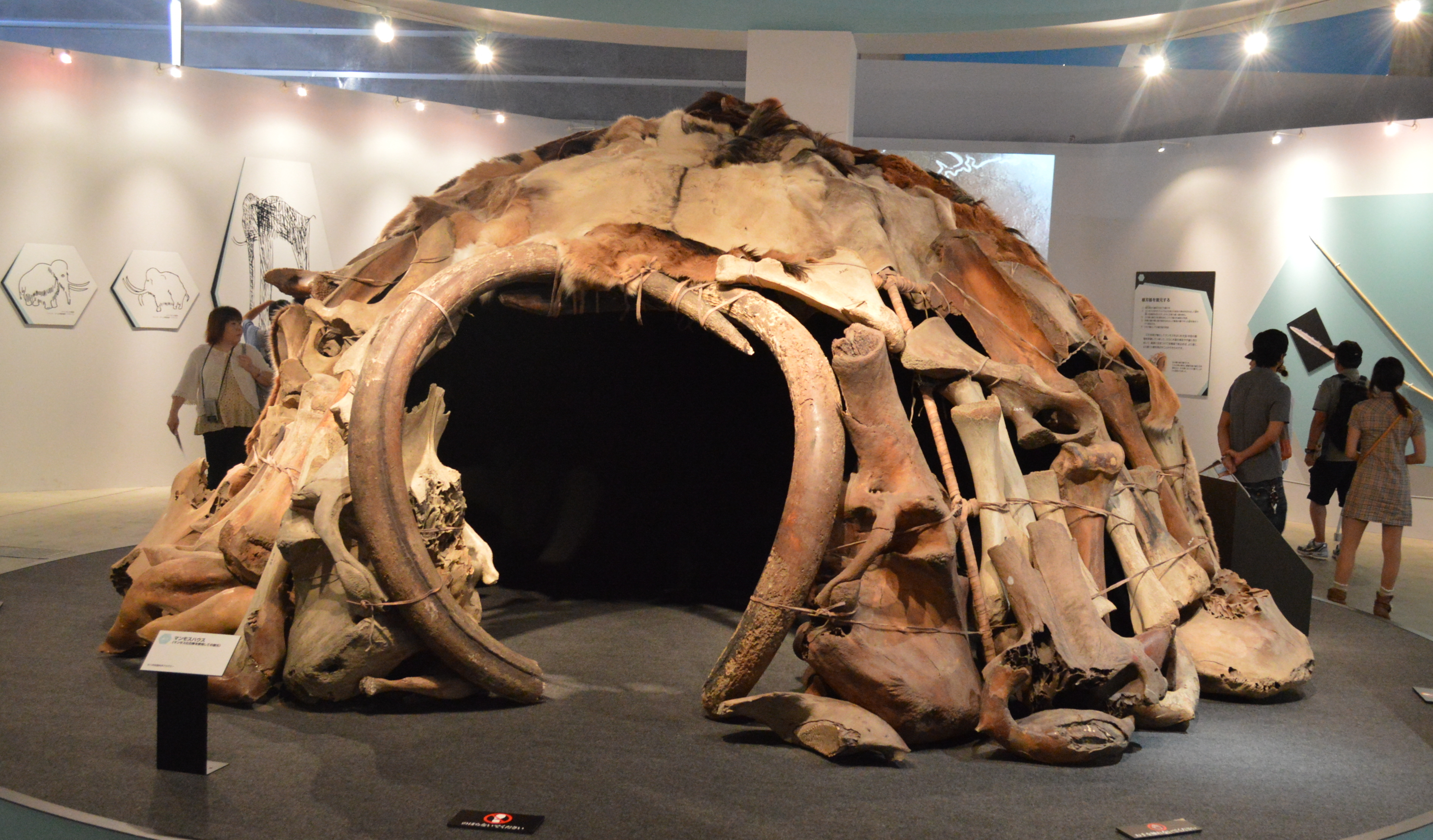
Reconstructed woolly mammoth bone hut, based on finds in Mezhyrich.

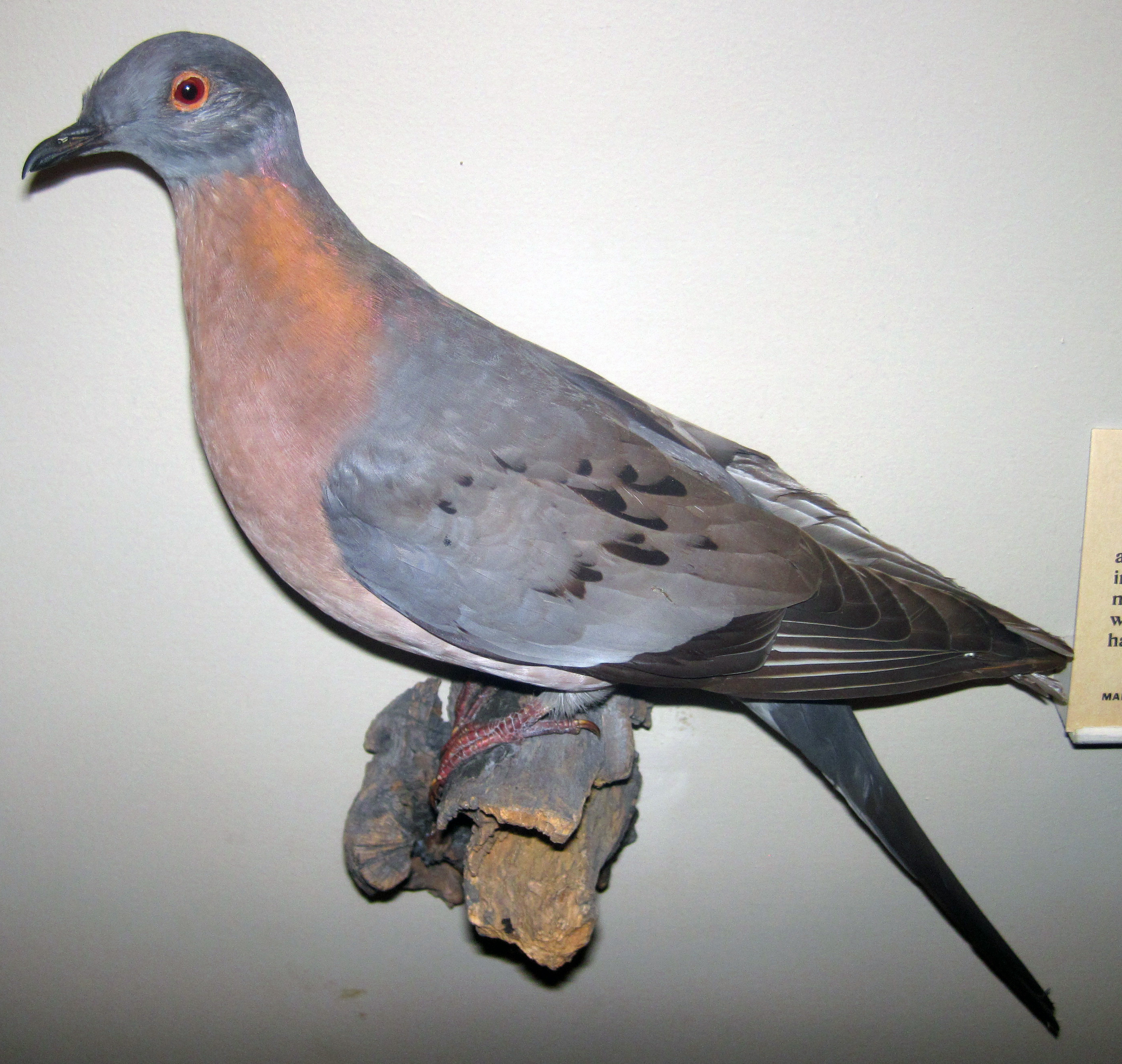
The passenger pigeon was a species of pigeon endemic to North America. It experienced a rapid decline in the late 1800s due to habitat destruction and intense hunting by European settlers. The last wild bird is thought to have been shot in 1901.

There has been a debate as to the extent to which the disappearance of megafauna at the end of the last glacial period can be attributed to human activities by hunting, or even by slaughter (Note: This may refer to groups of animals endangered by climate change. For example, during a catastrophic drought, remaining animals would be gathered around the few remaining watering holes, and thus become extremely vulnerable.) of prey populations. Discoveries at Monte Verde in South America and at Meadowcroft Rock Shelter in Pennsylvania have caused a controversy regarding the Clovis culture. There likely would have been human settlements prior to the Clovis culture, and the history of humans in the Americas may extend back many thousands of years before the Clovis culture. The amount of correlation between human arrival and megafauna extinction is still being debated: for example, in Wrangel Island in Siberia the extinction of dwarf woolly mammoths (approximately 2000 BC) did not coincide with the arrival of humans, nor did megafaunal mass extinction on the South American continent, although it has been suggested climate changes induced by anthropogenic effects elsewhere in the world may have contributed.

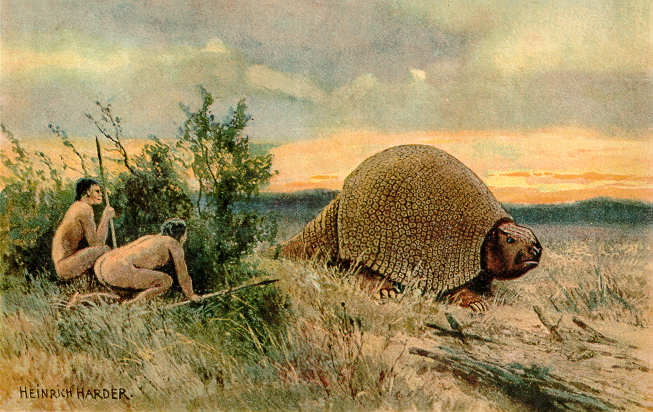
Illustration of Paleo-Indians hunting a glyptodon

Comparisons are sometimes made between recent extinctions (approximately since the Industrial Revolution) and the Pleistocene extinction near the end of the last glacial period. The latter is exemplified by the extinction of large herbivores such as the woolly mammoth and the carnivores that preyed on them. Humans of this era actively hunted the mammoth and the mastodon, but it is not known if this hunting was the cause of the subsequent massive ecological changes, widespread extinctions and climate changes.

The ecosystems encountered by the first Americans had not been exposed to human interaction, and may have been far less resilient to human made changes than the ecosystems encountered by industrial era humans. Therefore, the actions of the Clovis people, despite seeming insignificant by today's standards could indeed have had a profound effect on the ecosystems and wild life which was entirely unused to human influence.

In the Yukon, the mammoth steppe ecosystem collapsed between 13,500 and 10,000 BP, though wild horses and woolly mammoths somehow persisted in the region for millennia after this collapse. In what is now Texas, a drop in local plant and animal biodiversity occurred during the Younger Dryas cooling, though while plant diversity recovered after the Younger Dryas, animal diversity did not. In the Channel Islands, multiple terrestrial species went extinct around the same time as human arrival, but direct evidence for an anthropogenic cause of their extinction remains lacking. In the montane forests of the Colombian Andes, spores of coprophilous fungi indicate megafaunal extinction occurred in two waves, the first occurring around 22,900 BP and the second around 10,990 BP. A 2023 study of megafaunal extinctions in the Junín Plateau of Peru found that the timing of the disappearance of megafauna was concurrent with a large uptick in fire activity attributed to human actions, implicating humans as the cause of their local extinction on the plateau.

=== New Guinea ===
Humans in New Guinea used volcanically fertilised soil following major eruptions and interfered with vegetation succession patterns since the Late Pleistocene, with this process intensifying in the Holocene.

=== Australia ===
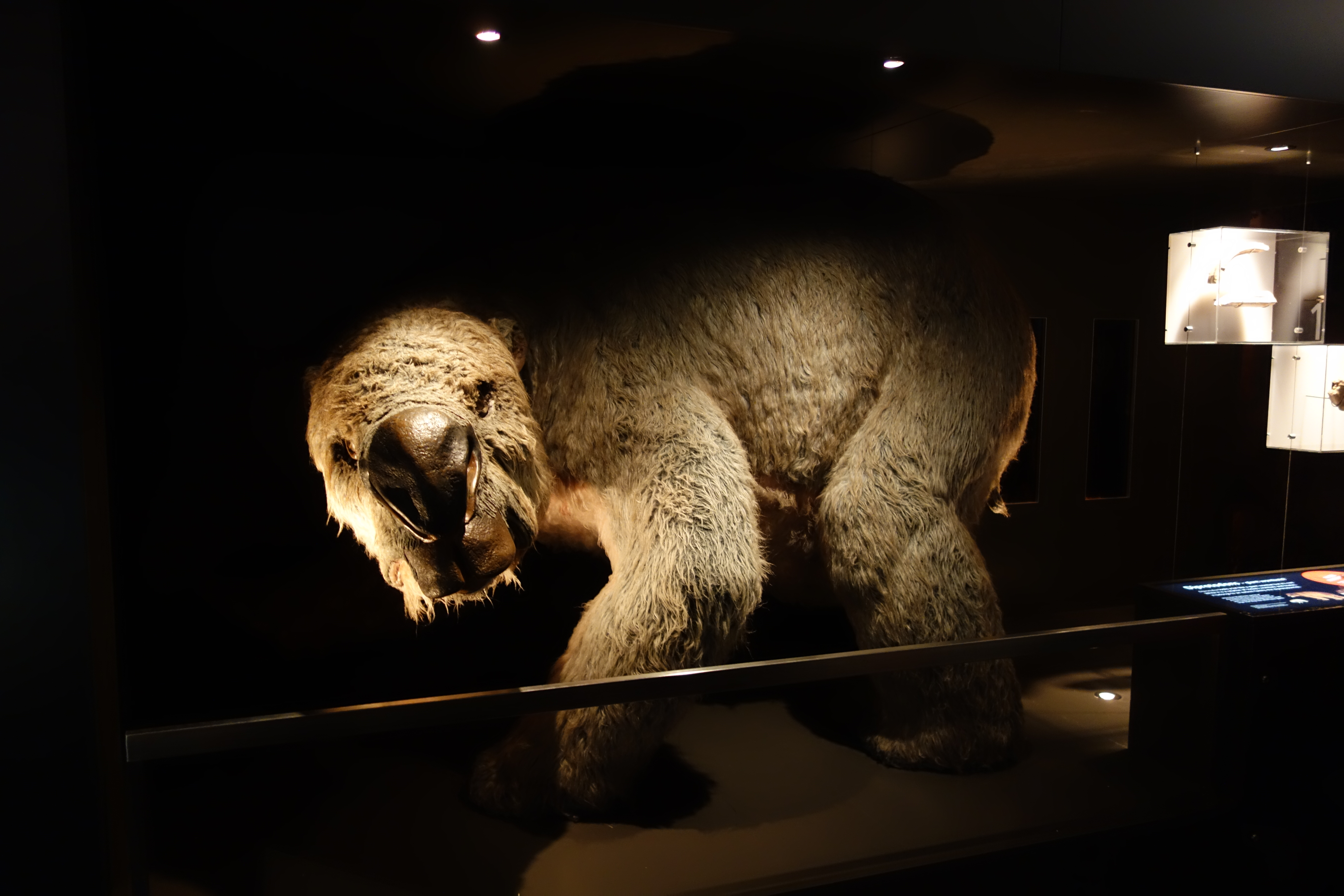
Reconstruction of a hippopotamus-sized Diprotodon

Australia was once home to a large assemblage of megafauna, with many parallels to those found on the African continent today. Australia's fauna is characterized by primarily marsupial mammals, and many reptiles and birds, all existing as giant forms until recently. Humans arrived on the continent very early, about 50,000 years ago. The extent human arrival contributed is controversial; climatic drying of Australia 40,000–60,000 years ago was an unlikely cause, as it was less severe in speed or magnitude than previous regional climate change which failed to kill off megafauna. Extinctions in Australia continued from original settlement until today in both plants and animals, while many more animals and plants have declined or are endangered.

Due to the older timeframe and the soil chemistry on the continent, very little subfossil preservation evidence exists relative to elsewhere. However, continent-wide extinction of all genera weighing over 100 kilograms, and six of seven genera weighing between 45 and 100 kilograms occurred around 46,400 years ago and the fact that megafauna survived until a later date on the island of Tasmania following the establishment of a land bridge suggest direct hunting or anthropogenic ecosystem disruption such as fire-stick farming as likely causes. The first evidence of direct human predation leading to extinction in Australia was published in 2016.

A 2021 study found that the rate of extinction of Australia's megafauna is rather unusual, with some generalistic species having gone extinct earlier while highly specialized ones having become extinct later or even still surviving today. A mosaic cause of extinction with different anthropogenic and environmental pressures has been proposed.

The arrival of invasive species such as feral cats and cane toads has further devastated Australia's ecosystems.

Since European colonisation Australia has lost over 100 plant and animal species, including 10% of its mammal species, the highest of any continent.

=== Caribbean ===
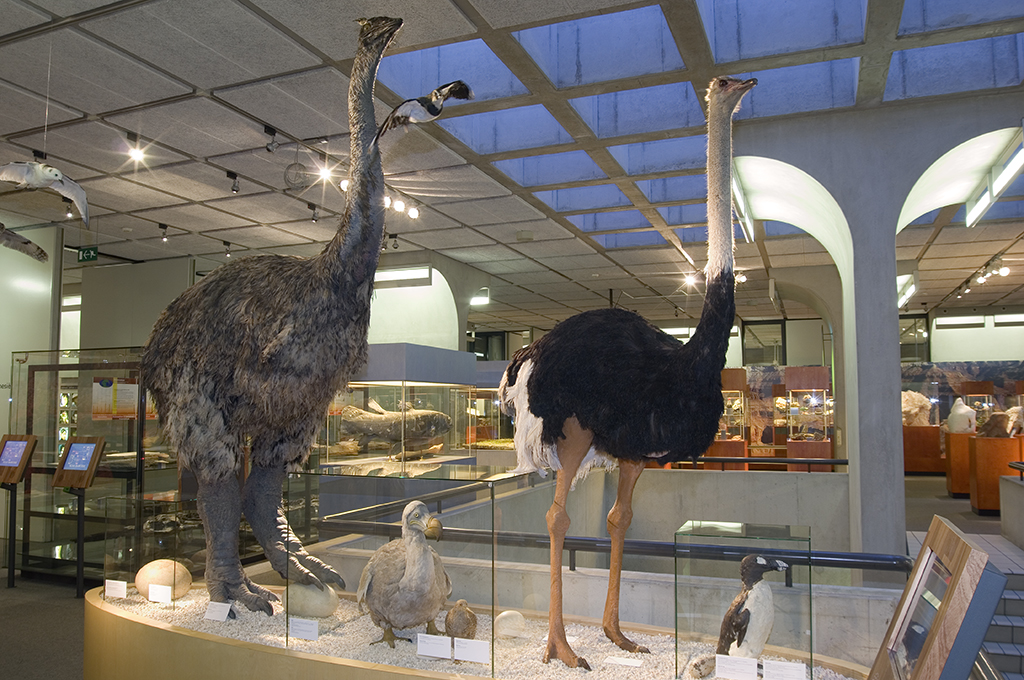
Recently extinct flightless birds include Madagascar's elephant bird (left), Mauritius's dodo and the great auk of the Atlantic (bottom right).

Human arrival in the Caribbean around 6,000 years ago is correlated with the extinction of many species. These include many different genera of ground and arboreal sloths across all islands. These sloths were generally smaller than those found on the South American continent. Megalocnus were the largest genus at up to 90 kilograms (200 lb), Acratocnus were medium-sized relatives of modern two-toed sloths endemic to Cuba, Imagocnus also of Cuba, Neocnus and many others.

=== Macaronesia ===
The arrival of the first human settlers in the Azores saw the introduction of invasive plants and livestock to the archipelago, resulting in the extinction of at least two plant species on Pico Island. On Faial Island, the decline of Prunus lusitanica has been hypothesized by some scholars to have been related to the tree species being endozoochoric, with the extirpation or extinction of various bird species drastically limiting its seed dispersal. Lacustrine ecosystems were ravaged by human colonization, as evidenced by hydrogen isotopes from C_{30} fatty acids recording hypoxic bottom waters caused by eutrophication in Lake Funda on Flores Island beginning between 1500 and 1600 AD.

The arrival of humans on the archipelago of Madeira caused the extinction of approximately two-thirds of its endemic bird species, with two non-endemic birds also being locally extirpated from the archipelago. Of thirty-four land snail species collected in a subfossil sample from eastern Madeira Island, nine became extinct following the arrival of humans. On the Desertas Islands, of forty-five land snail species known to exist before human colonization, eighteen are extinct and five are no longer present on the islands. Eurya stigmosa, whose extinction is typically attributed to climate change following the end of the Pleistocene rather than humans, may have survived until the colonization of the archipelago by the Portuguese and gone extinct as a result of human activity. Introduced mice have been implicated as a leading driver of extinction on Madeira following its discovery and settlement by humans.

In the Canary Islands, native thermophilous woodlands were decimated and two tree taxa were driven extinct following the arrival of its first humans, primarily as a result of increased fire clearance and soil erosion and the introduction of invasive pigs, goats, and rats. Invasive species introductions accelerated during the Age of Discovery when Europeans first settled the Macaronesian archipelago. The archipelago's laurel forests, though still negatively impacted, fared better due to being less suitable for human economic use.

Cabo Verde, like the Canary Islands, witnessed precipitous deforestation upon the arrival of European settlers and various invasive species brought by them in the archipelago, with the archipelago's thermophilous woodlands suffering the greatest destruction. Introduced species, overgrazing, increased fire incidence, and soil degradation have been attributed as the chief causes of Cabo Verde's ecological devastation.

=== Pacific ===
Archaeological and paleontological digs on 70 different Pacific islands suggested that numerous species became extinct as people moved across the Pacific, starting 30,000 years ago in the Bismarck Archipelago and Solomon Islands. It is currently estimated that among the bird species of the Pacific, some 2000 species have gone extinct since the arrival of humans, representing a 20% drop in the biodiversity of birds worldwide. In Polynesia, the Late Holocene declines in avifaunas only abated after they were heavily depleted and there were increasingly fewer bird species able to be driven to extinction. Iguanas were likewise decimated by the spread of humans. Additionally, the endemic faunas of Pacific archipelagos are exceptionally at risk in the coming decades due to rising sea levels caused by global warming.

Lord Howe Island, which remained uninhabited until the arrival of Europeans in the South Pacific in the 18th century, lost much of its endemic avifauna when it became a whaling station in the early 19th century. Another wave of bird extinctions occurred following the introduction of black rats in 1918.

The endemic megafaunal meiolaniid turtles of Vanuatu - representing the final members of a group that had existed for over 100 million years - became extinct immediately following the first human arrivals and remains of them containing evidence of butchery by humans have been found.

The arrival of humans in New Caledonia marked the commencement of coastal forest and mangrove decline on the island. The archipelago's megafauna - such as the large, flightless galliform Sylviornis - was still extant when humans arrived, but indisputable evidence for the anthropogenicity of their extinction remains elusive.

In Fiji, the giant iguanas Brachylophus gibbonsi and Lapitiguana impensa both succumbed to human-induced extinction shortly after encountering the first humans on the island.

In American Samoa, deposits dating back to the period of initial human colonisation contain elevated quantities of bird, turtle, and fish remains caused by increased predation pressure.

On Mangaia in the Cook Islands, human colonisation was associated with a major extinction of endemic avifauna, along with deforestation, erosion of volcanic hillsides, and increased charcoal influx, causing additional environmental damage.

On Rapa in the Austral Archipelago, human arrival, marked by the increase in charcoal and in taro pollen in the palynological record, is associated with the extinction of an endemic palm.

Henderson Island, once thought to be untouched by humans, was colonised and later abandoned by Polynesians. The ecological collapse on the island caused by the anthropogenic extinctions is believed to have caused the island's abandonment.

The first human settlers of the Hawaiian Islands are thought to have arrived between 300 and 800 AD, with European arrival in the 16th century. Hawaii is notable for its endemism of plants, birds, insects, mollusks and fish; 30% of its organisms are endemic. Many of its species are endangered or have gone extinct, primarily due to accidentally introduced species and livestock grazing. Over 40% of its bird species have gone extinct, and it is the location of 75% of extinctions in the United States. Evidence suggests that the introduction of the Polynesian rat, above all other factors, drove the ecocide of the endemic forests of the archipelago. Extinction has increased in Hawaii over the last 200 years and is relatively well documented, with extinctions among native snails used as estimates for global extinction rates. High rates of habitat fragmentation on the archipelago have further reduced biodiversity. The extinction of endemic Hawaiian avifauna is likely to accelerate even further as anthropogenic global warming adds additional pressure on top of land-use changes and invasive species.

=== Madagascar ===
Radiocarbon dating of multiple subfossil specimens shows that now extinct giant lemurs were present in Madagascar until after human arrival.

Within centuries of the arrival of humans around the 1st millennium AD, nearly all of Madagascar's distinct, endemic, and geographically isolated megafauna became extinct. The largest animals, of more than 150 kilograms (330 lb), were extinct very shortly after the first human arrival, with large and medium-sized species dying out after prolonged hunting pressure from an expanding human population moving into more remote regions of the island around 1000 years ago. as well as 17 species of "giant" lemurs. Some of these lemurs typically weighed over 150 kilograms (330 lb), and their fossils have provided evidence of human butchery on many species. Other megafauna present on the island included the Malagasy hippopotamuses as well as the large flightless elephant birds, both groups are thought to have gone extinct in the interval 750–1050 AD. Smaller fauna experienced initial increases due to decreased competition, and then subsequent declines over the last 500 years. All fauna weighing over 10 kilograms (22 lb) died out. The primary reasons for the decline of Madagascar's biota, which at the time was already stressed by natural aridification, were human hunting, herding, farming, and forest clearing, all of which persist and threaten Madagascar's remaining taxa today. The natural ecosystems of Madagascar as a whole were further impacted by the much greater incidence of fire as a result of anthropogenic fire production; evidence from Lake Amparihibe on the island of Nosy Be indicates a shift in local vegetation from intact rainforest to a fire-disturbed patchwork of grassland and woodland between 1300 and 1000 BP.

=== New Zealand ===
New Zealand is characterized by its geographic isolation and island biogeography, and had been isolated from mainland Australia for 80 million years. It was the last large land mass to be colonized by humans. Upon the arrival of Polynesian settlers in the late 13th century, the native biota suffered a catastrophic decline due to deforestation, hunting, and the introduction of invasive species. The extinction of all of the islands' megafaunal birds occurred within several hundred years of human arrival. The moa, large flightless ratites, were thriving during the Late Holocene, but became extinct within 200 years of the arrival of human settlers, as did the enormous Haast's eagle - their primary predator - the omnivorous adzebills and at least two species of large, flightless geese. The Polynesians also introduced the Polynesian rat, which may have consumed avian eggs and chicks. This may have put some pressure on other birds, but at the time of early European contact (18th century) and colonization (19th century), the bird life was nonetheless prolific. The megafaunal extinction happened extremely rapidly despite a very small population density, which never exceeded 0.01 people per km^{2}. Extinctions of parasites followed the extinction of New Zealand's megafauna. With them, the Europeans brought various invasive species including ship rats, possums, cats and mustelids which devastated native bird life, some of which had adapted flightlessness and ground nesting habits, and had no defensive behavior as a result of having no native mammalian predators. The kākāpō, the world's biggest parrot, which is flightless, now only exists in managed breeding sanctuaries. New Zealand's national emblem, the kiwi, is on the endangered bird list.

== Mitigation ==
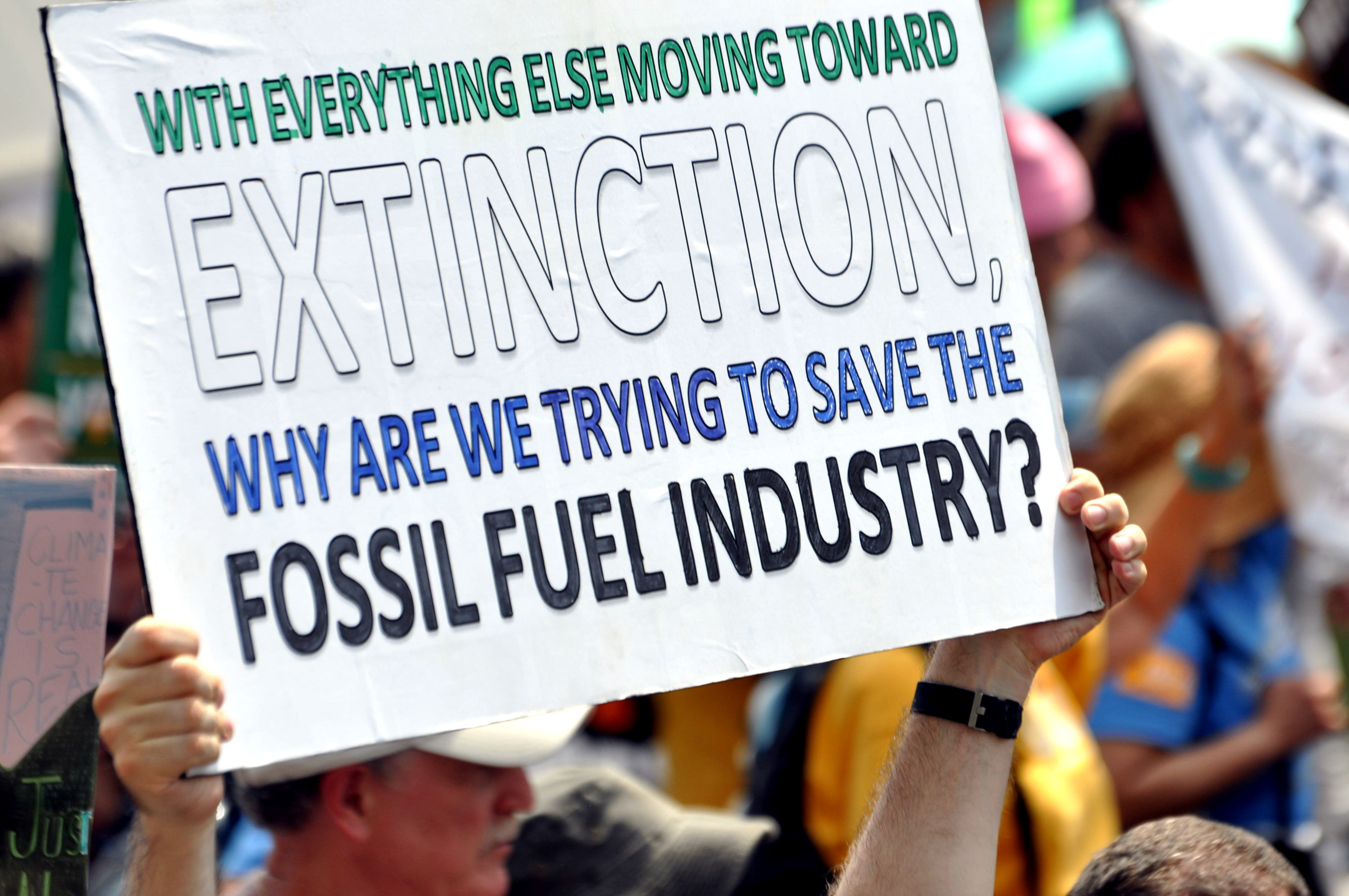
Climate March 2017

Extinction symbol

Stabilizing and gradually reducing human populations; reining in capitalism, decreasing economic demands, and shifting them to economic activities with low impacts on biodiversity; transitioning to plant-based diets; and increasing the number and size of terrestrial and marine protected areas have been suggested to avoid or limit biodiversity loss and a possible sixth mass extinction. Rodolfo Dirzo and Paul R. Ehrlich suggest that "the one fundamental, necessary, 'simple' cure, ... is reducing the scale of the human enterprise." According to a 2021 paper published in Frontiers in Conservation Science, humanity almost certainly faces a "ghastly future" of mass extinction, biodiversity collapse, climate change, and their impacts unless major efforts to change human industry and activity are rapidly undertaken.

A 2019 article in Science advocated for the global community to designate 30% of the planet by 2030, and 50% by 2050, as protected areas to mitigate the contemporary extinction crisis. It highlighted that the human population is projected to grow to 10 billion by the middle of the century, and consumption of food and water resources is projected to double by this time. A 2022 report published in Science warned that 44% of Earth's terrestrial surface, or 64 million square kilometres (24.7 million square miles), must be conserved and made "ecologically sound" to prevent further biodiversity loss.

In November 2018, the UN's biodiversity chief Cristiana Pașca Palmer urged people worldwide to pressure governments to implement significant protections for wildlife by 2020. She called biodiversity loss a "silent killer" as dangerous as global warming but said it had received little attention by comparison. "It's different from climate change, where people feel the impact in everyday life. With biodiversity, it is not so clear but by the time you feel what is happening, it may be too late." In January 2020, the UN Convention on Biological Diversity drafted a Paris-style plan to stop biodiversity and ecosystem collapse by setting the deadline of 2030 to protect 30% of the Earth's land and oceans and to reduce pollution by 50%, to allow for the restoration of ecosystems by 2050. The world failed to meet the Aichi Biodiversity Targets for 2020 set by the convention during a summit in Japan in 2010. Of the 20 biodiversity targets proposed, only six were "partially achieved" by the deadline. It was called a global failure by Inger Andersen, head of the United Nations Environment Programme:

From COVID-19 to massive wildfires, floods, melting glaciers and unprecedented heat, our failure to meet the Aichi (biodiversity) targets—to protect our home—has very real consequences. We can no longer afford to cast nature to the side.

Some scientists have proposed keeping extinctions below 20 per year for the next century as a global target to reduce species loss, which is the biodiversity equivalent of the 2 °C climate target, although it is still much higher than the normal background rate of two per year prior to anthropogenic impacts on the natural world.

An October 2020 report on the "era of pandemics" from IPBES found that many of the same human activities that contribute to biodiversity loss and climate change, including deforestation and the wildlife trade, have also increased the risk of future pandemics. The report offers several policy options to reduce such risk, such as taxing meat production and consumption, cracking down on the illegal wildlife trade, removing high disease-risk species from the legal wildlife trade, and eliminating subsidies to businesses which are harmful to the environment. According to marine zoologist John Spicer, "the COVID-19 crisis is not just another crisis alongside the biodiversity crisis and the climate change crisis. Make no mistake, this is one big crisis—the greatest that humans have ever faced."

In December 2022, nearly every country on Earth, with the United States and the Holy See being the only exceptions, signed onto the Kunming-Montreal Global Biodiversity Framework agreement formulated at the 2022 United Nations Biodiversity Conference (COP 15) which includes protecting 30% of land and oceans by 2030 and 22 other targets intended to mitigate the extinction crisis. The agreement is weaker than the Aichi Targets of 2010. It was criticized by some countries for being rushed and not going far enough to protect endangered species.

Reducing human population growth has been suggested as a means of mitigating climate change and the biodiversity crisis, although many scholars believe it has been largely ignored in mainstream policy discourse. An alternative proposal is greater agricultural efficiency & sustainability. Lots of non-arable land can be made into arable land good for growing food crops. Mushrooms have also been known to repair damaged soil.

== See also ==
- Extinction symbol
- Extinction: The Facts (2020 documentary)
- Lists of extinct species
- Pleistocene rewilding
- Racing Extinction (2015 documentary film)
- Timeline of extinctions in the Holocene
- The Sixth Extinction, an episode of The X-Files
