= Background extinction rate =

Standard rate of extinction

Background extinction rate (BER), also known as the normal extinction rate, refers to the standard rate of extinction in Earth's geological and biological history, excluding major extinction events, such as the current human-induced Holocene extinction. There have been five mass extinction events throughout Earth's history.

== Overview ==
Extinctions are a normal part of the evolutionary process, and the background extinction rate is a measurement of "how often" they naturally occur. Normal extinction rates are often used as a comparison to present day extinction rates, to illustrate the higher frequency of extinction today than in all periods of non-extinction events before it.

Background extinction rates have not remained constant, although changes are measured over geological time, covering millions of years. There has been a decline in background extinction rates over the Phanerozoic eon, particularly from the middle of the Palaeozoic era, which has been attributed to increased oxygenation of the oceans.

== Measurement ==
Background extinction rates are typically measured in order to give a specific classification to a species and this is obtained over a certain period of time. There are three different ways to calculate background extinction rate. The first is simply the number of species that normally go extinct over a given period of time. For example, at the background rate one species of bird will go extinct every estimated 400 years. Another way the extinction rate can be given is in million species years (MSY). For example, there is approximately one extinction estimated per million species years. From a purely mathematical standpoint this means that if there are a million species on the planet earth, one would go extinct every year, while if there was only one species it would go extinct in one million years, etc. The third way is in giving species survival rates over time. For example, given normal extinction rates species typically exist for 5–10 million years before going extinct.

== Lifespan estimates ==
Some groups' lifespan estimates by taxonomy are given below (Lawton & May 1995).

- Invertebrates: These species' average lifespan is 11 million years. Some reasons these species go extinct are from habitat loss, overharvesting, pollution, invasive species, and climate change. Invertebrates make up most of Earth's biodiversity which is why they do not go extinct as fast as other species.
- Marine Invertebrates: These species' average lifespan is 5–10 million years. Many marine invertebrates face extinction because of the high levels of dissolved carbon dioxide in aquatic environments. Seawater chemistry changes with the increase carbon levels which makes it hard for these organisms to survive. Similar to terrestrial invertebrates, marine invertebrates make up most of Earth's biodiversity which is why they do not go extinct as fast as other species.
- Marine Animals: These species' average lifespan is 4–5 million years. Reasons why marine animals go extinct include interactions with fisheries, capturing, pollution, habitat degradation, climate change, and overharvesting.
- Mammals: These species' average lifespan is 1 million years. Habitat loss is the leading reason for why mammals go extinct. Other reasons that follow this are overexploitation, invasive species, pollution, and climate change.
- Diatoms: These species' average lifespan is 8 million years. Diatoms rely on silica to build their shells, which benefited them when oceans originally started to become more acidic. Now as oceans continue to become even more acidic, it becomes harder for them to continue to thrive. From this information it can be concluded that these species are going to extinct due to high rates of ocean acidification.
- Dinoflagellates: These species' average lifespan is 13 million years. It takes a lot for these species to go extinct because they are so prominent in aquatic environments. Dinoflagellates were severely affected during the Triassic extinction, suggesting that the warming of ocean waters can affect the livelihood of these organisms.
- Planktonic Foraminifera: These species' average lifespan is 7 million years. These species face extinction in cases of glaciation events, hyperthermal events, and climate change.
- Cenozoic Bivalves: These species' average lifespan is 10 million years. The reason for why members of this group go extinct is related to environmental deterioration.
- Echinoderms: These species' average lifespan is 6 million years. The reason why members of this group went extinct is related to ocean acidification. Ocean acidification makes it hard for the echinoderms to build their shells.
- Silurian Graptolites: These species' average lifespan is 2 million years. Reasons why members of this group go extinct include climate change, rising sea levels, and loss of habitats.

Taxonomy	Source of Estimate	Species Average Lifespan (Millions of Years)
All Invertebrates	Raup (1978)	11
Marine Invertebrates	Valentine (1970)	5–10
Marine Animals	Raup (1991)	4
Marine Animals	Sepkoski (1992)	5
All Fossil Groups	Simpson (1952)	0.5–5
Mammals	Martin (1993)	1
Cenozoic Mammals	Raup and Stanley (1978)	1–2
Diatoms	Van Valen	8
Dinoflagellates	Van Valen (1973)	13
Planktonic Foraminifera	Van Valen (1973)	7
Cenozoic Bivalves	Raup and Stanley (1978)	10
Echinoderms	Durham (1970)	6
Silurian Graptolites	Rickards (1977)	2
