= Rodolfo Dirzo =

Rodolfo Dirzo is a professor, conservationist, and tropical ecologist. He is a Bing Professor in environmental science at Stanford and a senior fellow at the Stanford Woods Institute for the Environment. His research interests mainly focus on plant-animal interactions, evolutionary ecology, and defaunation in the tropics of Latin America, Africa, and the Central Pacific. He was a member of the Committee on A Conceptual Framework for New K-12 Science Education Standards, co-authoring the framework in 2012, and continues to educate local communities and young people about science and environmental issues.

== Early life and education ==
Dirzo was born in Cuernavaca, Morelos, Mexico. He received his Bachelor of Science degree in biology from the Universidad Nacional Autónoma de México (UNAM) in 1972, where he did thesis work on vegetation mapping of a watershed north of Mexico City. After receiving his bachelor's degree, Dirzo worked in the lab of Professor José Sarukhán, a renowned tropical ecologist, at UNAM for a few years. As a research assistant for Dr. Sarukhán, Dirzo worked on a long-term tree demography study collecting data on tree characteristics over time to eventually determine how humans impacted tree population dynamics. He obtained his MS and PhD degrees, both in Ecology and both under prominent plant ecologist John Harper, from the University of Wales, UK in 1977 and 1980, respectively. Inspired by Charles Darwin's On the Origin of Species and his mentors, Sarukhán and Harper, Dirzo decided to focus his graduate work on how animals influence plant ecology and evolution, and more specifically on the evolution of anti-herbivore defenses in plants. His master's thesis and dissertation examined how the white clover (Trifolium repens) may have developed increased cyanogenic properties as an adaptation to herbivory by slugs.

== Career ==
Dirzo has held many professional appointments, serving as a professor, director, chairperson, and coordinator for multiple institutions. In 1983, he became a professor with the Instituto de Biología at the Los Tuxtlas Biological Station in Veracruz, Mexico. He was later appointed director of Los Tuxtlas in the mid-1980s and began researching patterns of herbivory in the area. After his time at Los Tuxtlas, Dirzo returned to UNAM as a professor with the Instituto de Ecología, where he taught for 16 years. Dirzo currently teaches ecology, natural history, and conservation science in the Biology Department at Stanford University, where he has been an instructor since 2005. While at Stanford, he also served as director for the center for Latin American Studies (2010–2016) and co-director of the INOGO Program of the Woods Institute for the Environment (2011–2017).

== Research ==
=== Herbivory and Defaunation in Mexico ===
After finishing his graduate programs, Dirzo went back to Mexico, where he hoped to determine if the same concepts he examined in his graduate work could explain plant-animal interactions in tropical ecosystems. As director of the Los Tuxtlas Biological Station, he began analyzing amounts of herbivory in the region and found no evidence of mammalian herbivory. This led him to believe mammalian herbivores were relatively unimportant for tropical forests. In 1992, Dirzo received a Marine Fellowship from the PEW Fellows Program in Conservation and the Environment, which he used to develop a research laboratory at the Chajul Field Station in the Montes Azules Biosphere Reserve, Mexico. He used this reserve and research station to continue his work on herbivory patterns. He found that in Montes Azules, where human encroachment was not impacting the area as it was in Los Tuxtlas, there were blatant signs of mammalian herbivory. His research in these areas led him to understand that, contrary to his hypothesis, mammals were important to tropical ecosystems, and that Los Tuxtlas was experiencing defaunation (loss of fauna), most likely due to anthropogenic causes. Dirzo pioneered the study on the impacts of humans on defaunation and illuminated the importance of ecosystem services provided by mammalian herbivores to lower trophic levels (i.e. plants) in the tropical ecosystem.

=== Expanding to Africa and beyond ===
In more recent years, Dirzo has carried his research on to other parts of the world, researching how defaunation is impacting these regions, as well. In the African savanna, Dirzo's student Hillary Young studied how defaunation leads to an increase in the population of rodents due to loss of medium and large vertebrates that either directly prey on rodents or consume rodent habitat (i.e. grass). Since rodents are known disease reservoirs, one major consequence of this is an increase in disease transmission, especially since defaunation usually occurs in highly populated areas (however, he also finds that effects of defaunation can vary based on secondary land use employed). Currently, Dirzo is “conducting a review analysis to assess the consistency of differential defaunation across the globe”. Additionally, he is working with Mexico's national commission for biodiversity (CONABIO) on a countrywide evaluation of biodiversity across Mexican ecosystems, while also looking at how defaunation may be increasing animal-to-human disease transmission (AKA zoonosis) in Mexico.

== Community involvement ==
Besides teaching and conducting research, Dirzo also works to educate young people and local communities about science and the environment. In the San Francisco Bay Area, he is involved with projects that target minorities and underprivileged groups, such as the Redwood Academy of Leadership (REAL), Science Technology Engineering and Mathematics (STEM) for Latina Girls, and Stanford Science for the East Palo Alto Academy. These programs aim to give children and young adults the chance to participate in hands-on science education, observe how science professionals operate, and possibly inspire their future careers. When visiting his field sites in other countries, he also seeks to teach the local communities, especially children, about the importance of the region's biodiversity and environmental stewardship.

== Honors and awards ==
Dirzo has been recognized for his contributions to the ecological, academic, and conservation fields in the United States and Mexico. Below are a selection of these distinctions:

- 1992 - Pew Scholar in Conservation, The Pew Charitable Trusts, Madison, Wisconsin, USA
- 2002 - Outstanding Service Award: Teaching, Organization for Tropical Studies
- 2003 - Presidential Award: Ecological Merit in Research by SEMARNAT, Ministry of Environment
- 2003 - Member, Mexican Academy of Sciences
- 2003 - Outstanding Researcher, Biology, Universidad Nacional Autónoma de México
- 2003 - Presidential Award in Ecology, Secretary of Environment, Mexico
- 2004 - Foreign Associate, US National Academy of Sciences
- 2004 - Foreign Member, American Academy of Arts and Sciences
- 2008 - Member, California Academy of Sciences
- 2012 - Fellow of the Ecological Society of America
- 2015 - Medal of Honor (Science), State Congress, Morelos, Mexico
- 2015 - Merit in Ecology Medal, Ecological Society of Mexico
- 2016 - Miriam Arnold Rollan Prize for Volunteer Service, Stanford University
- 2017 - Medal for Merit in Research and Education, International Association for Tropical Biology
- 2017 - President Miguel Aleman Medal for Outstanding Work in Ecology and Environmental Problems, Mexico City
- 2017 - Medal Alfonso L. Herrera: Distinguished Scientist, Universidad Autonoma de Puebla, Mexico, Mexico City
- 2023 - BBVA Foundation Frontiers of Knowledge Award.

== Select publications ==
Below are just a few of the 160+ papers written and co-written by Dirzo:

- Dirzo, R. & Harper, J.L. 1982. Ditto. IV. The performance of cyanogenic and acyanogenic plants of Trifolium repens in the field. Journal of Ecology 70: 119-128
- Dirzo, R. 1987. Estudios sobre interacciones planta-herbívoro en “Los Tuxtlas”, Veracruz. Revista de Biología Tropical 36: 119–132
- Dirzo, R. & Miranda, A. 1990. Contemporary neotropical defaunation and forest structure, function and diversity: a sequel to John Terborgh. Conservation Biology 4: 444-447
- Dirzo, R. & Raven, P.H. 1994. Un inventario biológico para México. Boletín de la Sociedad Botánica de México. 55:29-34
- Dirzo, R, & P. H. Raven. 2003. Global biodiversity and loss. Annual Review of Environment and Natural Resources. 28: 137-167
- Wright, S.J., Stoner, K.E., Beckman, N., Corlett, R.T., Dirzo, R., Muller-Landau, H.C., Nunez-Iturri, G., Peres, C.A., & Wang, B.C. 2007. The plight of large animals in tropical forests and the consequences for plant regeneration. Biotropica 39:289-291
- Young, H.S., McCauley, D., Helgen, K.M., Goheen, J.R., Otárola-Castillo, E., Palmer, T.D., Pringle, R.M., Young, T.M., & Dirzo, R. 2013. Effects of mammalian herbivore declines on plant communities: observations and experiments in an African savannah. Journal of Ecology 101: 1030-1041
- Galetti, M. & Dirzo, R. 2013. Ecological and evolutionary consequences of living in a defaunated world. Biological Conservation 163: 1–6. 117
- Young, H., McCauley, D., & Dirzo, R. 2013. Context-dependent effects of large wildlife declines on small mammal communities in Central Kenya. Ecological Applications, 25: 348-360
- Young, H.S., Dirzo, R., Helgen, K.M., McCauley, D.J., Billeter, S. Kosoy, M. Osikowicz, L., Salkeld, D., Young, T.P., Dittmar, K. 2014. Declines in large wildlife increase landscape-level prevalence of a rodent-borne disease in Africa. Proceedings of the National Academy of Sciences of the US, www.pnas.org/cgi/doi/10.1073/pnas.1404958111
- Dirzo, R., Young, H.S., Balle, C., Galetti, M. 2014. Defaunation in the Anthropocene. Science 345: 401-406.
- Ceballos, G., Ehrlich, P., Dirzo, R. 2017. Biological annihilation via the ongoing sixth mass extinction signaled by vertebrate population losses and declines. Proceedings of the National Academy of Sciences of the US, doi/10.1073/pnas.1704949114
- Dirzo, Rodolfo; Ceballos, Gerardo; Ehrlich, Paul R. (2022). "Circling the drain: the extinction crisis and the future of humanity". Philosophical Transactions of the Royal Society B. 377 (1857). doi:10.1098/rstb.2021.0378. PMC 9237743. PMID 35757873.
