= Butterfly Conservation =

British environmental organisation

- Logo
- Abbreviation: BC
- Formation: 1968
- Legal status: Nonprofit
- Purpose: Improving the environment for butterflies and moths.
- Location: Manor Yard, East Lulworth, Wareham, Dorset, BH20 5QP
- Region served: UK-wide
- Members: More than 40,000
- President: Sir David Attenborough
- Chief Executive: Julie Williams
- Website: butterfly-conservation.org

Butterfly Conservation is a UK-wide nonprofit environmentalist organisation and charity dedicated to conserving butterflies, moths, and the environment. The charity uses its research to provide advice on how to conserve and restore butterfly and moth habitats and it runs projects to protect more than 100 threatened species of Lepidoptera. Butterfly Conservation is also involved in conserving hundreds of sites and reserves for butterflies and moths throughout the UK.

Butterfly Conservation has more than 37,000 members and 31 volunteer-led branches throughout the UK, as well as the European Butterflies Group. The organisation's head office is based in East Lulworth, Dorset, with additional offices in Scotland, Wales and Northern Ireland.

== History ==
The organisation was originally formed in 1968 as the British Butterfly Conservation Society by a small group of naturalists and it was registered as a charity on 7 March 1968. It was incorporated as a company on 17 December 1987, and changed its name to Butterfly Conservation in December 2003.

Sir David Attenborough became President of the society in 1998. It launched its annual butterfly survey - the Big Butterfly Count - in 2010. The charity celebrated its 50th anniversary year in 2018.

== Activities ==
Butterfly Conservation aims to maintain and enhance landscapes for butterflies and moths. The charity provides advice to landowners and managers on how to conserve and restore habitats. Its staff and volunteers work to gather extensive butterfly and moth data and conduct research to provide the scientific evidence that underpins and informs the charity's work.

Butterfly Conservation has an established record of reversing declines and run programmes for more than 100 threatened species of butterflies and moths.

Butterfly Conservation operates three of the world’s largest butterfly and moth recording schemes, which together have gathered more than 60 million records. This includes the world's largest butterfly survey, the Big Butterfly Count. This citizen science survey encourages people to spot and record common butterflies and two day-flying moths during three weeks of high summer.

The charity also runs a number of moths schemes and conservation activities focusing solely on the conservation of moths that people can get involved in.

Butterfly Conservation produces three editions of its membership magazine Butterfly every year. The magazine is distributed to members, institutions, conservation bodies and others interested or involved in the conservation of butterflies, moths and related wildlife. The publication has an estimated readership of 60,000.

== Reserves ==
As of January 2026, Butterfly Conservation manages 26 nature reserves, mostly in England.

- Alners Gorse, Dorset
- Bentley Station Meadow, Hampshire
- Catfield Fen, Norfolk
- Ewyas Harold Meadows, Herefordshire
- Grafton Wood, Worcestershire
- Haddon Moor, Somerset
- Lankham Bottom, Dorset
- Little Breach, Devon
- Lydford Old Railway, Devon
- Magdalen Hill Down, Hampshire
- Monkwood, Worcestershire
- Myers Allotment, Lancashire
- Park Corner Heath, East Sussex
- Prees Heath Common Reserve, Shropshire
- Prestbury Hill, Gloucestershire
- Rough Bank, Gloucestershire
- Rowland Wood, East Sussex
- Ryton Wood Meadows, Warwickshire
- Snakeholme Pit, Lincolnshire
- Stoke Camp, Somerset
- Westbury Beacon, Somerset
- Yew Hill, Hampshire

=== Scotland ===
- Wester Moss, Stirling

=== Wales ===
- Caeau Ffos Fach, Cross Hands, Carmarthenshire
- Eyarth Rocks, Ruthin, Denbighshire

== Organisational structure ==
Butterfly Conservation is a company limited by guarantee, registered in England (2206468). Registered Office: Manor Yard, East Lulworth, Wareham, Dorset, BH20 5QP. Charity registered in England and Wales (254937) and in Scotland (SCO39268) VAT No GB 991 2771 89.

President: Sir David Attenborough has served as President of the charity since 1998.

Chief executive: Julie Williams (2017–present). Previously (2003–2016): Martin Warren

Vice Presidents: Jim Asher, Maurice Avent, Nick Baker, John F Burton, Dudley Cheeseman, Sue Collins, The Earl of Cranbrook, David Dennis, Mike Dilger, Clive Farrell, Karen Goldie-Morrison, David Hanson, Ian Hardy, Amir Khan, Chris Packham, Jeremy Thomas and Alan Titchmarsh (as at 31 March 2025).

=== UK branches ===
The organisation has over 30 volunteer-led branches across the UK.

- Bedfordshire and Northants
- Cambridgeshire and Essex
- Cheshire and Wirral
- Cornwall
- Cumbria
- Devon
- Dorset
- East Midlands
- East Scotland
- Glasgow and South West Scotland
- Gloucestershire
- Hampshire & Isle of Wight
- Hertfordshire and Middlesex
- Highlands and Islands
- Kent and South East London
- Lancashire
- Lincolnshire
- Northern Ireland
- Norfolk
- North East England
- North Wales
- South Wales
- Somerset and Bristol
- Suffolk Branch
- Surrey and South West London
- Sussex
- Upper Thames
- Warwickshire
- West Midlands
- Wiltshire
- Yorkshire

The European Butterflies Group has also been established as a BC volunteer-led branch, which promotes the study, conservation and enjoyment of butterflies, moths and their habitats in Europe.

== See also ==
- Buglife
- Bumblebee Conservation Trust
- Insect Week
- Pollinator Partnership
- Xerces Society
