= Peter G. Kevan =

British-Canadian entomologist

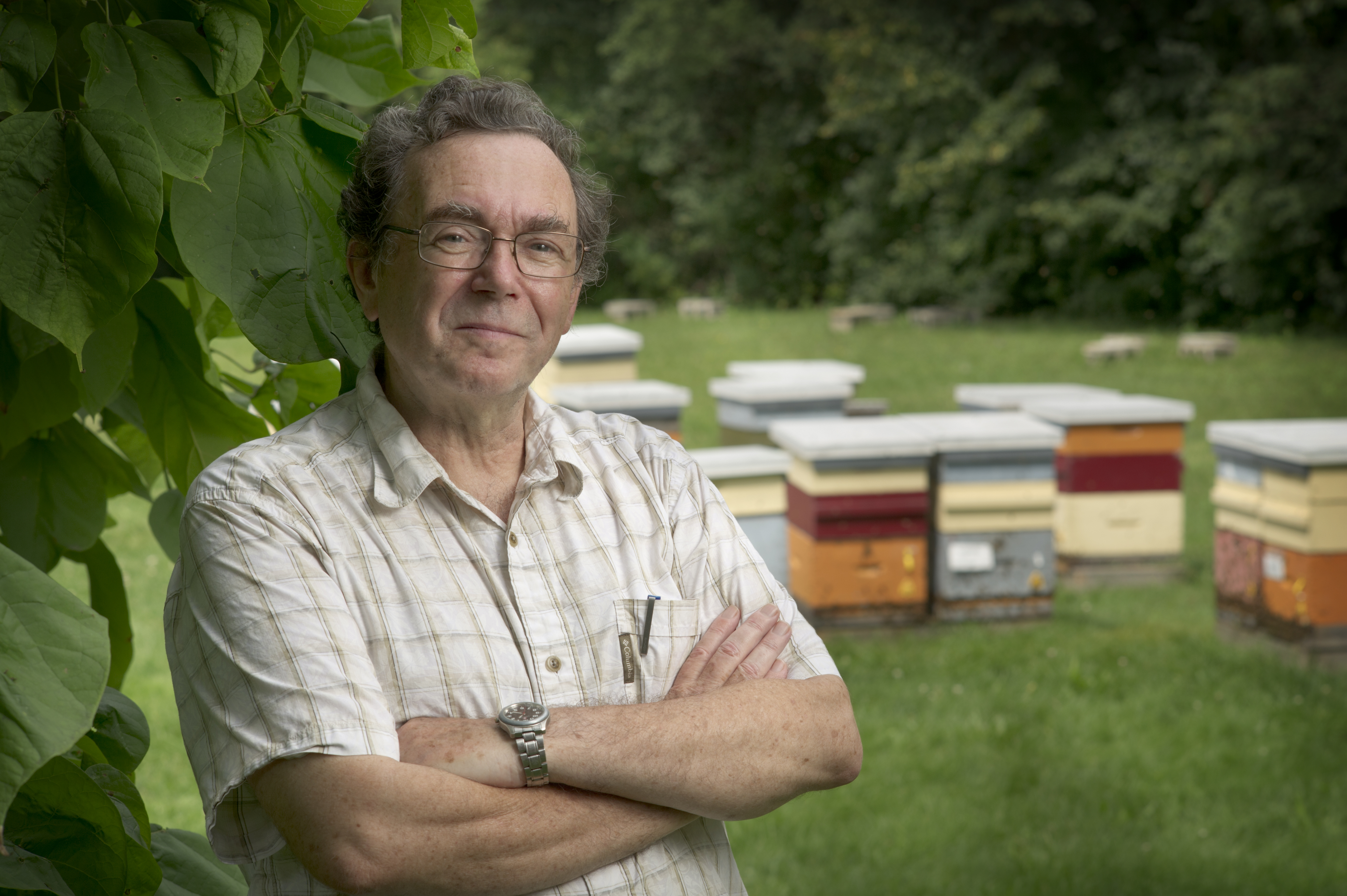
- Born: June 17, 1944 (age 82); Scotland, United Kingdom
- Education: McGill University (BSc), University of Alberta (PhD)
- Known for: Arctic Pollination; Insect colour perception and flower colours Insect and plant thermoregulation Effect of pesticides on pollinators NSERC-CANPOLIN (The Canadian Pollination Initiative); Pollinator and pollination biodiversity and conservation Crop pollination Apiculture
- Spouse: Sherrene Kevan
- Children: Colin Douglas Kevan and Grafton Kale Kevan
- Awards: Gold Medalist, Entomological Society of Canada (2005) (twice – 1983, 1990); Alumni Honour Award, University of Alberta (2003)
- Scientific career
- Fields: Entomology, botany, apiculture, pollination ecology
- Workplaces: University of Alberta, Canadian Wildlife Service (Western Region), Agriculture and Agri-Food Canada, Memorial University of Newfoundland, Agriculture and Agri-Food Canada, University of Colorado, University of Guelph, NSERC-CANPOLIN
- Thesis: High Arctic Insect-Flower Relations: The Inter-relationships of Arthropods and Flowers at Lake Hazen, Ellesmere Island, N.W.T., Canada (1970)
- Doctoral advisor: Professor Brian Hocking

Peter G. Kevan (/kĕvːăn/; born June 17, 1944) is a British-Canadian entomologist, applied ecologist and pollination biologist.

His research covers Arctic pollination, insect colour perception and floral colours, bee biology, thermoregulation in plants and insects; arctic, alpine, tropical and temperate zone forest and Carolinian ecology; paleontology, beekeeping, agricultural pollination, effects of pesticides on pollinators, and biodiversity.

Kevan was co-founder and scientific director of the Canadian Pollination Initiative (CANPOLIN), a national network of Canadian pollination researchers funded by the Canadian Natural Sciences and Engineering Research Council (NSERC).

He is a fellow of the Royal Society of Canada, the Canadian Academy of Sciences, the Linnean Society and the Royal Entomological Society of London.

He has been involved with issues around the conservation of pollinators and pollination through the International Commission for Plant-Pollinator Relations (ICPPR), the North American Pollinator Protection Campaign (NAPPC) and the Intergovernmental Science-Policy Platform for Biodiversity and Ecosystem Services (IPBES).

He is currently a Professor Emeritus at the University of Guelph.

== Scientific career ==
Kevan was a contract biologist with the Canadian Wildlife Service (Western Region) in Inuvik, Northwest Territories, researching Arctic ecology and environmental impacts of oil exploration and vehicular traffic on tundra ecosystems, between 1970 and 1976.

Kevan was a contract biologist with the Canadian Wildlife Service (Western Region) in Inuvik, Northwest Territories, researching Arctic ecology and environmental impacts of oil exploration and vehicular traffic on tundra ecosystems, between 1970 and 1976. During that period, he was project manager for the Memorial University of Newfoundland's Research Unit on Vector Pathology (RUVP) researching biological control of blackflies as vectors of human disease (Onchocerciasis in West Africa) and blackfly ecology in Canada.

=== Arctic research ===
Kevan's doctoral research demonstrated the importance of insect-mediated pollination of Arctic plants, especially by flies, but also other Northern arthropods including springtails, moths, butterflies and Northern bees. Insect pollination was previously thought unimportant because Arctic insect numbers were considered too low and the summer season too cool and short to allow for reliable pollination interactions.

During his doctoral studies, Kevan also studied thermoregulation in flowers, butterflies, caterpillars and cocoons. This work has been cited by scholars of Arctic and Alpine biology and been applied to tropical ecology.

As contract biologist with the Canadian Wildlife Service, Kevan investigated effects of oil exploration on tundra ecosystems. With encouragement from eminent ecologist J.B. Cragg, he studied effects of vehicle tracks on high arctic terrain. He analyzed impacts of such vehicles on Arctic plants, soil chemistry and structure, diversity of soil-dwelling mites and mechanics of soil compression. Kevan also conducted systematic surveys of muskox and caribou on Banks Island in the Northwest Territories.

In 2007, Kevan took part in the International Polar Year. He documented Arctic insects in a collaborative project with Dr. Robert Roughly (University of Manitoba), Paul Hebert and Tom Woodcock (University of Guelph). Their work made early use of genetic barcoding.

Since then, Kevan has worked with Jack Trevors, Alison Derry, Ling Tam and others to study microbiological diversity in Arctic soils, freshwater, marine water, and anthropogenically altered soil environments.

=== Insect perception, learning and cognition ===
During Kevan's doctoral research, he devised a novel system to measure floral colours as insects see them. That research precedes the Colour Opponency Coding System for insects developed by German zoologists Randolf Menzel, Lars Chittka and Werner Backhaus in the 1990s. Kevan has since published with these scholars about colour perception in bees through the German Academic Exchange Service (DAAD).

=== Palaeoecology ===
In 1975, Kevan conducted a palaeontological analysis of interactions between plants, fungus and insects during the Devonian Period with evolutionary biologist Doug Savile and plant fossil expert William Gilbert Chaloner. This study linked Devonian mites and springtails with spore dispersal and reproduction of early terrestrial plants.

He has since published on explosive pollen release in the fossil species Ekrixanthera ehecatli with American evolutionary biologist George Poinar.

=== Apiculture and crop pollination ===
From 1984 to 2009, Kevan taught the University of Guelph's long-running apiculture course, which has over a century of history. As part of the course's development, he wrote and published Bees, Biology and Management, a reference book about beekeeping and honeybee biology, in 2007. He shared his apiculture knowledge through an internationally recognized course in pollination ecology which he taught in several countries, notably in North, South and Central America.

In 2014, Kevan presented briefing materials on the status of honeybees in Canada to the Canadian government's Senate committee on Forestry & Agriculture and in 2016 to the House of Commons Standing Committee on Agriculture on Honeybee Health.

=== Pesticide impacts ===
Between 1975 and 1989, Kevan published a series of controversial papers demonstrating adverse and lethal effects of the organophosphate pesticide Fenitrothion on pollinators, causing lower blueberry yields and economic losses in New Brunswick and Nova Scotia.

=== Bio-control with bees ===
Kevan and his colleagues have lectured and published internationally on apivectoring technology. In 2019, Kevan and others co-presented an international course in Belgrade on using managed pollinators to disseminate biological control agents, presented in partnership with the International Organization for Biological Control (IOBC), the International Commission for Plant-Pollinator Relations (ICPPR) and the International Union for Biological Sciences (IUBS).

=== Plant stem temperatures ===
Presently, Kevan has returned to his early roots in plant micrometeorology. His current research measures internal temperatures inside solid and hollow plant stems. His work examines micrometeorology of stems, reasons for different temperature regimes and possible implications of such findings around plant survival during climate change.
