= Bumblebee Conservation Trust =

British charity

- Formation: 2006
- Legal status: Registered charity
- Purpose: Bumblebees in the UK
- Location: 6-7 Beta Centre, University of Stirling Innovation Park, FK9 4NF
- Region served: United Kingdom
- Chief Executive: Gill Perkins
- Website: www.bumblebeeconservation.org

The Bumblebee Conservation Trust is an organisation in the UK that makes efforts to monitor and conserve bumblebees and their habitat.

== History ==
The Bumblebee Conservation Trust was established by Dave Goulson in 2006 with a grant of £49,900 from the Heritage Lottery Fund. There were serious concerns for the ‘plight of the bumblebees’, as the populations of bumblebees have significantly declined in the last 80 years - two UK species have become nationally extinct and several others have declined dramatically.

The charity has three main aims:

- Supporting the conservation of all UK bumblebees, whether they are rare or common.
- An increase in the awareness, understanding and education about bumblebees and the social, environmental and economic benefits they provide.
- Ensuring the trust is sustainable, effective, and responsive to the challenges ahead.

In 2012 the Bumblebee Conservation Trust launched its national Bees for Everyone project to raise public awareness of the threats bumblebees face and to help rare bumblebees through active conservation work to safeguard, restore and create habitats for them. This successful project formed partnerships and has since evolved into new projects. Four of these projects focus on the two rarest bumblebee species in the UK, the shrill carder-bee and the great yellow bumblebee. The fifth project, 'Pollinating the Peak', has spread into the Midlands and focuses on the bilberry bumblebee. The final ongoing project is the reintroduction of the short-haired bumblebee, which has previously gone extinct in the UK.

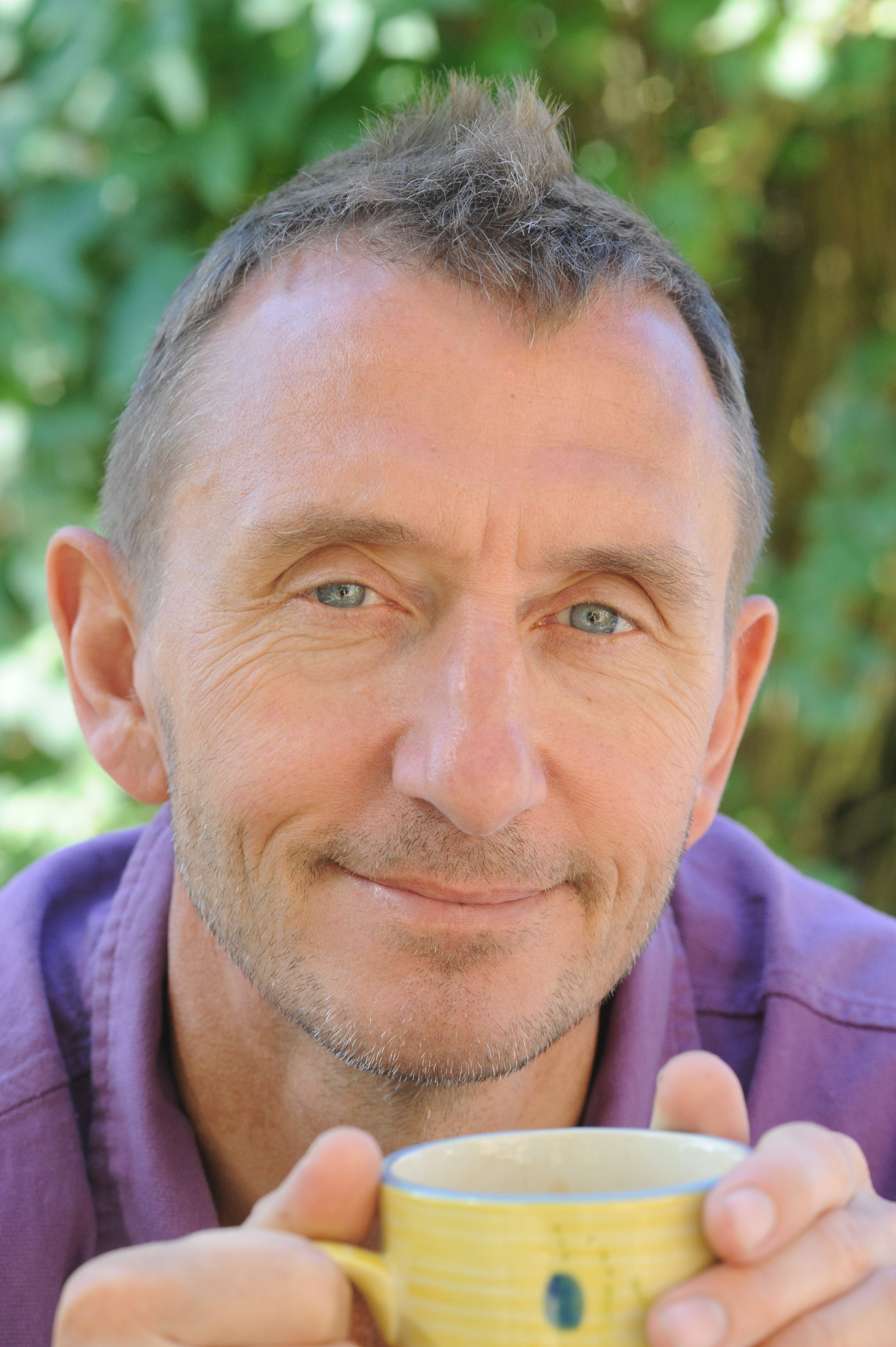
The ecologist Dave Goulson founded the Bumblebee Conservation Trust in 2006.

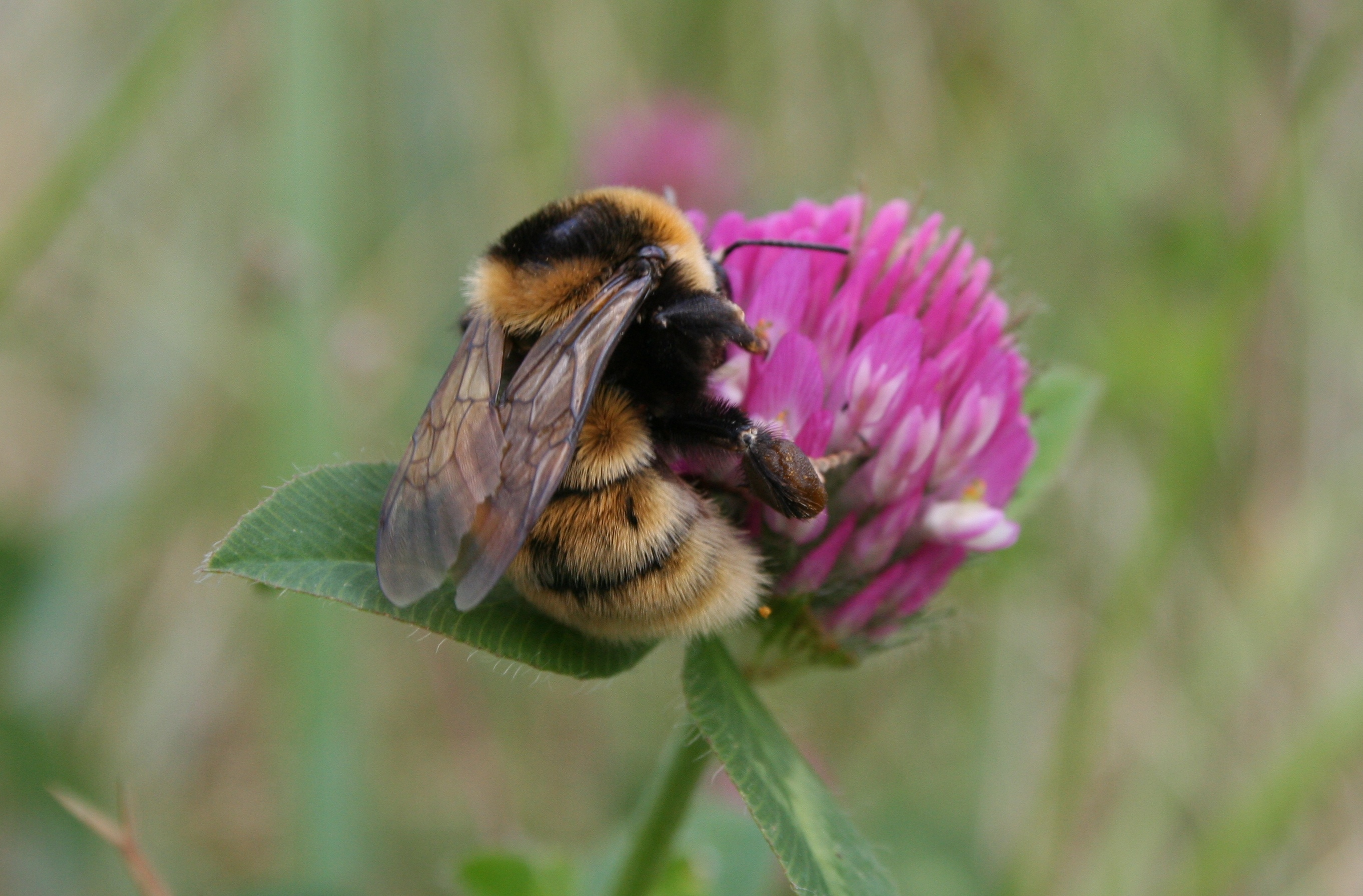
One of the Trust's projects is to save the rare great yellow bumblebee in Britain.

== Structure ==
The Bumblebee Conservation Trust is a charitable organisation registered with the Office of the Scottish Charity Regulator and Charity Commission for England and Wales. The Trust has over 9,000 members.

Its main office is in Scotland, located at the University of Stirling and it has a registered office in Eastleigh, near Southampton. The Trust also has a number of conservation staff based remotely across the UK in the areas where the UK's rarest bumblebees occur.

== See also ==
- Pollinator Partnership
- Buglife
- Butterfly Conservation
- Insect Week
- Xerces Society
