= Dave Goulson =

British ecologist and entomologist

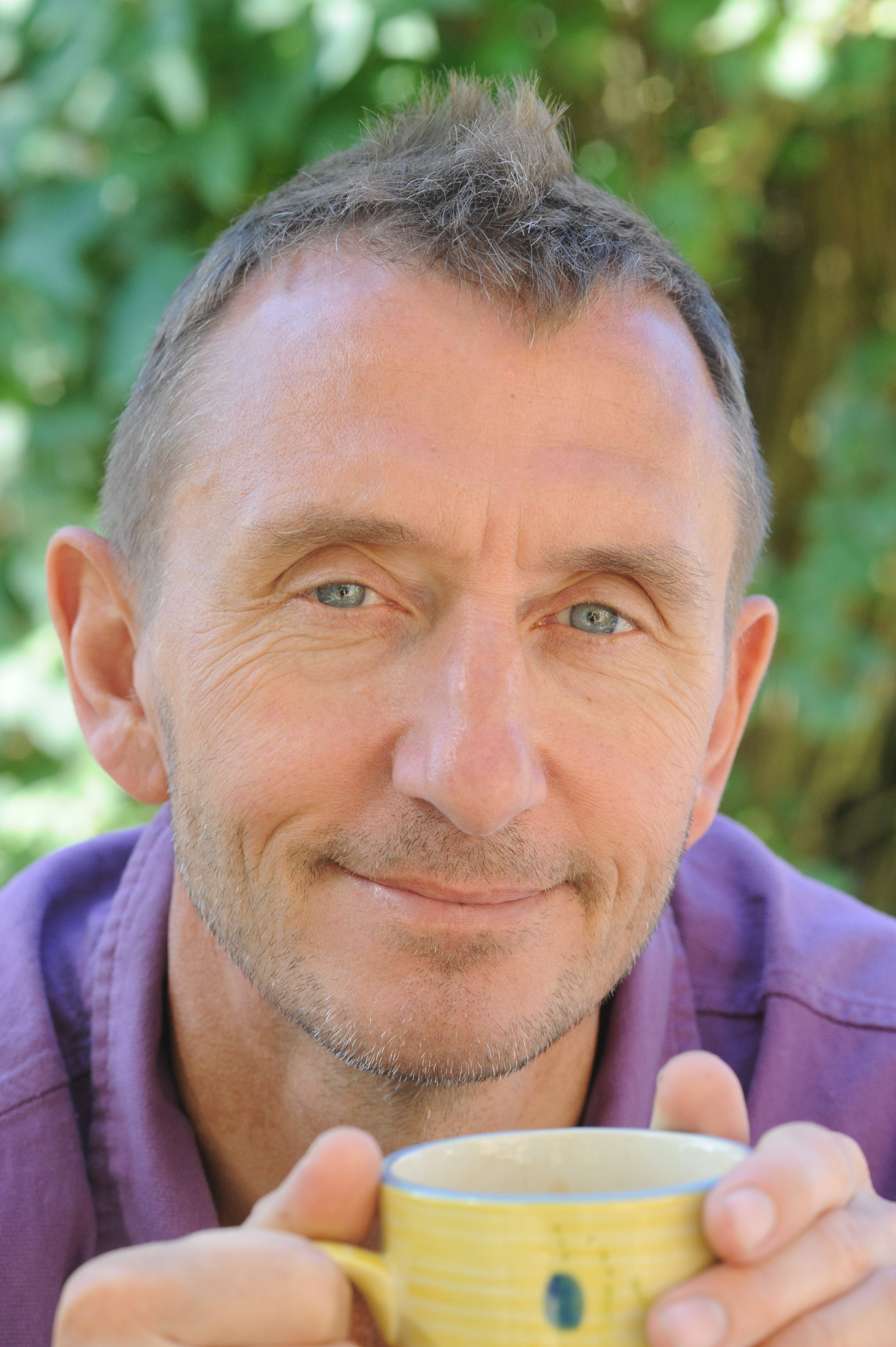
- Goulson in 2014
- Born: 30 July 1965; Shropshire, England
- Education: University of Oxford; Oxford Brookes University (PhD)
- Occupation: Ecologist
- Employer: University of Sussex
- Known for: Bumblebee ecology and conservation

Dave Goulson FRSE FRES (born 30 July 1965) is Professor of Biology (Evolution, Behaviour and Environment) at the University of Sussex. Specializing in the ecology and conservation of insects, particularly bumblebees, Goulson is the author of several books, including Bumblebees: Their Behaviour and Ecology (2003), Silent Earth: Averting the Insect Apocalypse (2021), and more than 200 academic articles. In 2006 he founded the Bumblebee Conservation Trust, a charity that aims to reverse the decline in the bumblebee population.

== Early life and education ==
Goulson's upbringing was in rural Shropshire. He attended Adams Grammar School from 1977 to 1982, then New College, Telford from 1982 to 1984.

He studied biology at Brasenose College, Oxford, then completed a PhD in butterfly ecology at Oxford Brookes University under the supervision of Denis Owen.

Goulson has said that when he was born in 1965, the British short-haired bumblebee was quite widespread, but he never managed to see one before they became extinct in the UK. In his book A Sting in the Tale (2013), he described a causal link between World War II and the decline of the bee as a result of intensive farming, pesticide use, and the resultant habitat loss, initially caused by a need to increase wartime food production. "The shorthaired bumblebee died out because its habitats were swept away," he wrote. "It wasn't all that fussy, it just needed enough flowers to feed on: no flowers equals no bees."

== Career ==
Goulson started his academic career at Southampton University in 1995 as a lecturer in biology, where he began to research the life of bumblebees. In 2006 he transferred to the University of Stirling as Professor of Biological Sciences. He was awarded the Biotechnology and Biological Sciences Research Council BBSRC Social Innovator of the Year in 2010. In 2013 he moved to the University of Sussex as Professor of Biology (Evolution, Behaviour and Environment). In 2015 he was listed at No. 8 in BBC Wildlife magazine's list of the top 50 "Conservation Heroes". He serves on the board of trustees of the Pesticide Action Network and as an Ambassador for The Wildlife Trusts in the United Kingdom.

== Bumblebee Conservation Trust ==
In 2006 Goulson founded the charity the Bumblebee Conservation Trust. He was well aware that too much scientific research was read only by fellow scientists and that there was a need to engage the wider public: "You can publish experiments in high quality journals again and again but they are only read by a few dozen scientists who work in your field. It achieves little or nothing in the real world."

== Awards ==
- (2010). Biotechnology & Biological Sciences Research Council's Social Innovator of the Year Award.
- (2013). Zoological Society of London's Marsh Award for Conservation Biology.
- (2014). British Ecological Society's Public Engagement Award.

== Selected works ==
- (2003). Bumblebees: Their Behaviour and Ecology. Oxford: Oxford University Press. ISBN 0198526075 (2nd edition 2010)
- (2009). Gardening for Bumblebees. Stirling: Bumblebee Conservation Trust. OCLC 320492385
- (2013). A Sting in the Tale. London: Jonathan Cape. ISBN 0224096893 (Shortlisted for the Samuel Johnson Prize)
- (2014). A Buzz in the Meadow. London: Jonathan Cape. ISBN 0224101749
- (2017). Bee Quest. London: Jonathan Cape. ISBN 1911214136
- (2019). The Garden Jungle. London: Jonathan Cape. ISBN 9781787331358
- (2021). Gardening for Bumblebees. London: Square Peg. ISBN 9781529110289
- (2021). Silent Earth: Averting the Insect Apocalypse. London: Random House. ISBN 9781473590502
