= Luke Tilley =

British entomologist and chief executive

Luke Tilley FRES FRSA
- Education: University of York (PhD); University of Sheffield (BSc)
- Scientific career
- Workplaces: Stockbridge Technology Centre; Royal Entomological Society

Luke Tilley (born 8 January 1983) is a British entomologist and science communicator. He is Director of Communications and Engagement at the Royal Entomological Society and Insect Week Coordinator in the UK.

== Education and career ==
Tilley is from Cheshire and studied his biology undergraduate degree at the University of Sheffield graduating in 2005. He received his Ph.D from the University of York in 2010, studying the parasitoid wasps of shore flies in lettuce and celery crop glasshouses. He then worked as a research manager at Stockbridge Technology Centre (formerly Horticulture Research International) while coordinating Insect Week. In 2012 he joined the Royal Entomological Society to work as Director of Outreach and Development, moving to chief executive officer in 2018, and Director of Communications and Engagemenent in 2021.

== Research ==
Tilley's research looked at the parasitoid wasp Aphaereta debilitata as a biological control agent of the shore fly Scatella tenuicosta, a pest in glasshouse crop soil. He found that the wasps reduced numbers of flies emerging from soil and subsequently there was a decrease in lettuce damage levels. He also found that levels of algae growing on the soil were negatively correlated with A debilitata and concluded that growers should encourage algal growth, as part of a conservation biological control programme.

He has also been involved in research on the interactions between beneficial insects such as hoverflies and parasitoid wasps and in finding gaps in knowledge about the conservation of beneficial insects

== Science Communication ==
As well as National Insect Week, Tilley coordinates other outreach activities such as Insect Festival, the Great Bug Hunt which runs in collaboration with The Association for Science Education and is editor of INSTAR with Adam Hart.

He has organised international symposia on insects and the public, is an expert contributor to the Guinness Book of World Records and has written about insects for a range of different publications including the National Association of Environmental Education. In 2013 he contributed to a panel on literature and science at the British Society of Literature and Science's annual meeting.

== Honours and awards ==
In 2011 Tilley was awarded Fellowship of the Royal Entomological Society and in 2020 he was awarded Fellowship of the Royal Society of Arts.
