= Pollinator Partnership =

American nonprofit organization

The Pollinator Partnership or P2 is a 501(c)(3) nonprofit organization with its headquarters in San Francisco, California that works to protect the health of managed and native pollinating animals that are vital to wildland and agricultural ecosystems. The Pollinator Partnership’s mission of environmental stewardship and pollinator protection is achieved through conservation, policy, education, and research. Signature initiatives include the NAPPC (North American Pollinator Protection Campaign), National Pollinator Week, and EcoRegional Planting Guides that allow local citizens to plant gardens that provide habitats for important pollinating species.

== Background and history ==
The Pollinator Partnership was founded as the Coevolution Institute (CoE) in 1997. The early mission of the organization was to promote research, outreach, and education relating to pollinating species and their floral associations. Their stakeholders include farmers, growers, policy makers, industry, academia, education, and the general public.

== Partnerships and collaboration ==
P2 has partnerships with many institutions, organizations, corporations, and individuals. They have worked closely with the National Fish and Wildlife Foundation to develop the EcoRegional Planting Guides. P2's conservation concern is relevant to a subset of the invertebrate species promoted by the Xerces Society for Invertebrate Conservation.

Corporate partnerships with Burt's Bees and Häagen-Dazs have helped them promote and preserve honey bee populations within the United States through their respective “Honey Bee Health” and “HD Loves Honey Bees” campaigns. P2 has also partnered with food producers and retailers such as Whole Foods Market, World Foods, Wyman's of Maine, and The Great Northern Roasting Company.

== Scientific advisory panel ==
The conservation work of the Pollinator Partnership is backed by scientific evidence on pollinator decline. Steve Buchmann, Ph.D., co-author of The Forgotten Pollinators, serves as P2's staff scientist. The P2 scientific advisory board includes entomologist E.O. Wilson, evolutionary ecologist Daniel Janzen, Ph.D.; entomologist May Berenbaum, Ph.D.; botanist Peter Raven, conservation biologist and president of Stanford's Center for Conservation Biology Paul R. Ehrlich, Ph.D.; chemical ecologist Thomas Eisner, Ph.D.; biologist Don Kennedy, Ph.D.; and scientist and natural history writer Adrian Forsyth, Ph.D.

== See also ==
- Xerces Society
- Buglife
- Insect Week
- Butterfly Conservation
- Bumblebee Conservation Trust
