= Stanley Norman Aflalo Jacobs =

- Born: 11 November 1896; Leytonstone, U.K.
- Died: 14 September 1989 (aged 92); Bromley, U.K.
- Occupation: Entomologist Shipbroker
- Spouse: Gladys Louise Fison
- Scientific career
- Institutions: British Museum (Natural History)

Stanley Norman Aflalo Jacobs (1896–1989) was a British entomologist and illustrator. Jacobs worked for many years at the British Museum (Natural History) and was an expert on Pyralid moths.

== Biography ==
Jacobs was born in Leytonstone on 11 November 1896. His parents were Harold Aflalo Jacobs, a shipbroker, and Amy Elizabeth Green, who had married in 1891.

Jacobs was interested in entomology from childhood, inspired by a personal museum which had belonged to his maternal grandfather Mark Green: Green had worked for P&O shipping and had been gifted insect specimens from the travels of his colleagues.

Jacobs was educated at St Dunstan's College, Catford, before becoming an apprentice at Vickers engineering company.

Jacobs served on the Western Front in the First World War with the 16th Middlesex Regiment and then the Royal Engineers before mustard gas exposure led to his being sent home as an invalid in 1918. Jacobs' only sibling, older brother Alan Edward Aflalo Jacobs (1895–1916), died during the conflict: Alan was awarded the Military Cross for conspicuous gallantry in May 1916 but went on to be reported missing in action near Armentières on 7 August 1916.

After the War Jacobs felt 'most unsettled' and found it difficult to get comfortable in any line of work: he spent some time studying agriculture and crop pests and assisted with a harvest in Canada, before he returned to the U.K. and followed his father into a career in shipbroking.

Jacobs was elected a member of the South London Entomological Society on 28 June 1923, and through the Society he would meet and befriend other entomologists including Norman Denbigh Riley, William Fassnidge and Edward Cockayne. Jacobs worked as editor of the journal The Entomologist's Record and Journal of Variation from 1955 to 1972. Due to working in London, Jacobs sought unusual outlets for his insect collecting such as visiting dried fruit merchants in the Eastcheap district to look for Pyralid moths in warehoused goods.

On 18 June 1927 Jacobs married Gladys Louise Fison (1900–1977) at St Saviour's Church in Forest Hill.

During the Second World War Jacobs worked as a Special Constable for the Metropolitan Police. Also during WWII, Jacobs was occupied with trapping the larvae of the moth Ephestia elutella (a.k.a. the cacao moth or warehouse moth) which was a pest of stored grain.

In 1954 Jacobs provided colour illustrations for Brian Patrick Beirne's book British Pyralid and Plume Moths.

From the mid-1930s Jacobs began working part time at the British Museum (Natural History) as a curator of Lepidoptera. He continued to volunteer at the Museum after his retirement from shipbroking in 1962. In the 1970s Jacobs decided to transfer his personal insect collections to the Museum. Papers relating to Jacobs' work dating from 1936 to 1979 were also accessioned by the Natural History Museum in 2004.

Jacobs was an active entomologist into his mid eighties. He died at Bromley on 14 September 1989.
