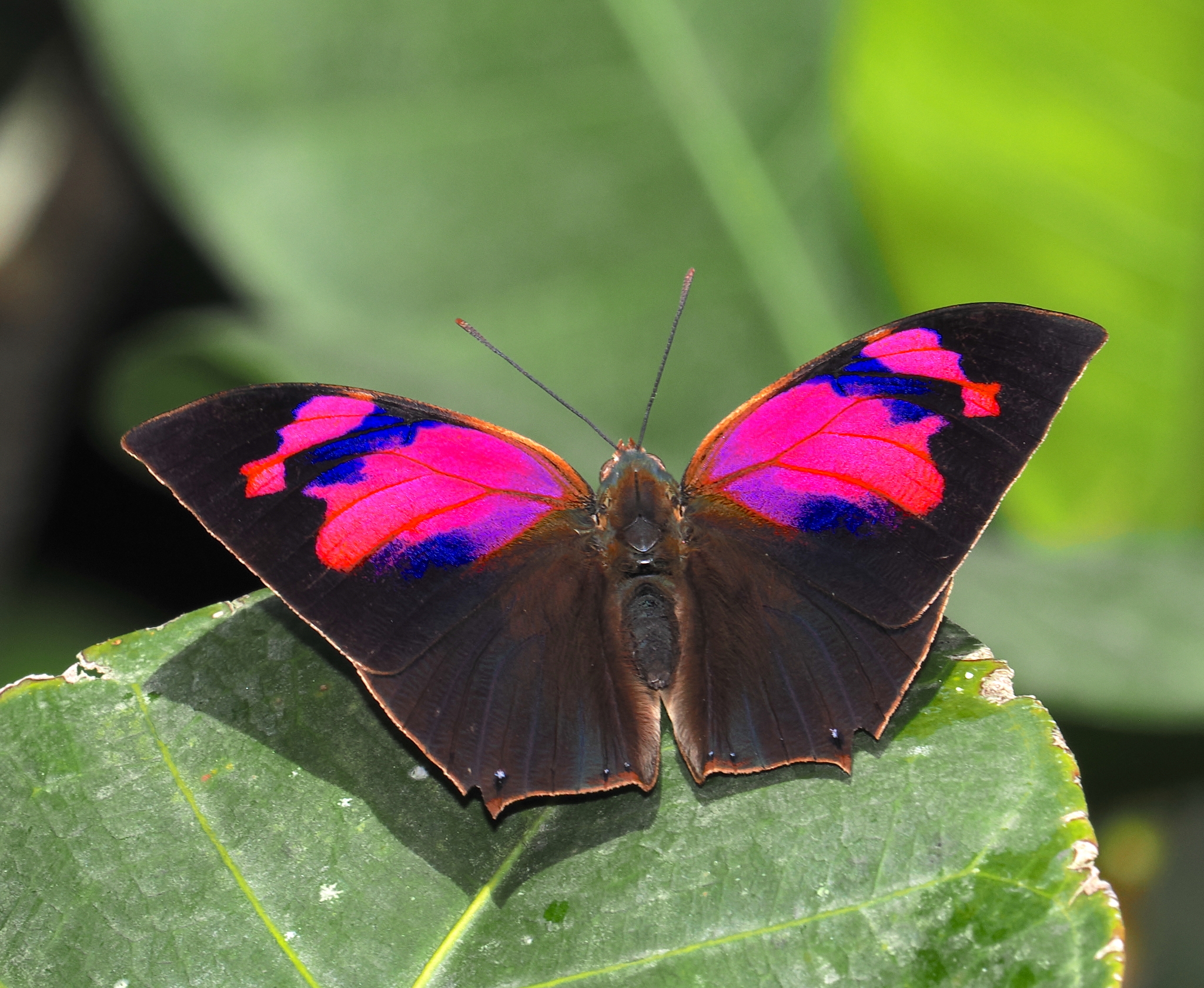
- Fountainea nessus

Scientific classification
- Kingdom: Animalia
- Phylum: Arthropoda
- Class: Insecta
- Order: Lepidoptera
- Family: Nymphalidae
- Tribe: Anaeini
- Genus: Fountainea; Rydon, 1971

= Fountainea =

Genus of brush-footed butterflies

Fountainea is a genus of Neotropical leaf butterflies. Their wing undersides usually mimic dead leaves.

This genus honours Margaret Fountaine, a renowned entomologist.

== Species ==
There are eight species in the genus:

Species	Common name	Dorsal	Ventral
Fountainea centaurus (Felder & Felder, 1867)			
Fountainea eurypyle (C. & R. Felder, 1862)	pointed leafwing		
Fountainea glycerium (Doubleday, 1849)	angled leafwing		
Fountainea halice (Godart, 1824)	ruddy leafwing		
Fountainea nessus (Latreille, 1813)	superb leafwing		
Fountainea nobilis (Bates, 1864)	noble leafwing		
Fountainea ryphea (Cramer, 1775)	flamingo leafwing		
Fountainea sosippus (Hopffer, 1874)			
