= Ewyas Harold Meadows =

Nature reserve near Ewyas Harold, Herefordshire, England

Coordinates: 51.961°N 2.898°W

Ewyas Harold Meadows is a nature reserve managed by Butterfly Conservation near the village of Ewyas Harold, Herefordshire, England.
