= Amateur Entomologists' Society =

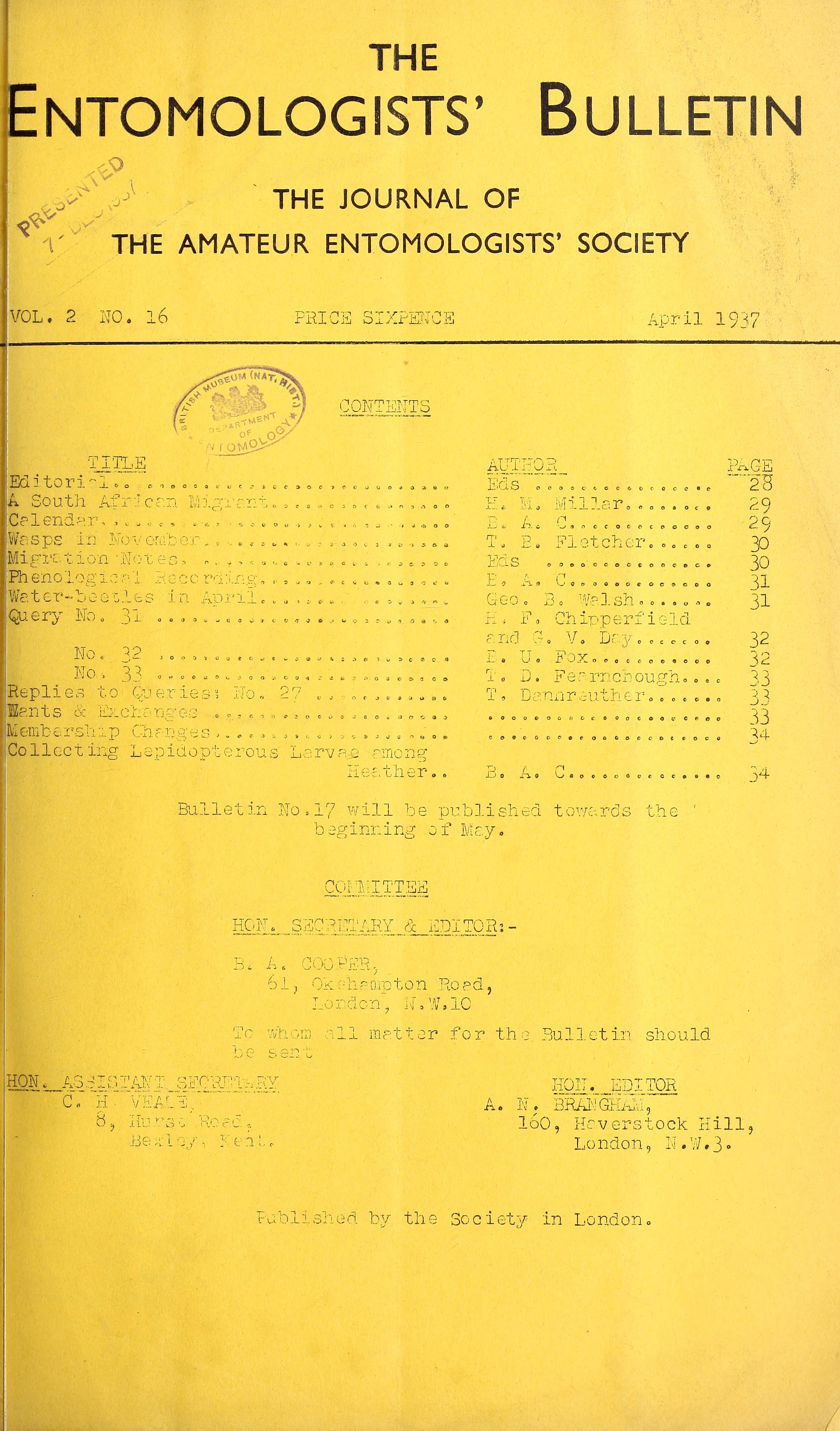
The Entomologists' Bulletin in 1937.

The Amateur Entomologists' Society (AES) is a UK organisation for people interested in insects.

== History ==
Based in the UK, the Amateur Entomologists' Society was founded in 1935 as The Entomological Exchange and Correspondence Club, for the purpose of providing a forum through which amateur and young entomologists could exchange not only information, but also equipment and other such items.

1937 saw the name of the group changed to the Amateur Entomologists Society, which has remained unchanged since then.

The journal of the AES first appeared as The Bulletin in 1939, and it was also during this year that the first non-periodical publication, a leaflet entitled "Coleoptera Collecting", was produced.

The Society has advised on invertebrate conservation issues for over 40 years, and has been consulted over legislation such as the UK's Wildlife and Countryside Act 1981, and reviews of the Act.

In 1989 the Bulletin became a bi-monthly journal instead of quarterly, and now has a colour section alternating with Invertebrate Conservation News.

However, during 1997 the AES merged with the Bug Club to form the AES Bug Club which is the junior section of the society today. The Bug Club has a separate bi-monthly journal, The Bug Club Magazine.

The Entomologist's Record and Journal of Variation became a publication of the Amateur Entomologists' Society in January 2009.

== See also ==
- Royal Entomological Society
- Buglife
- Insect Week
- Xerces Society
