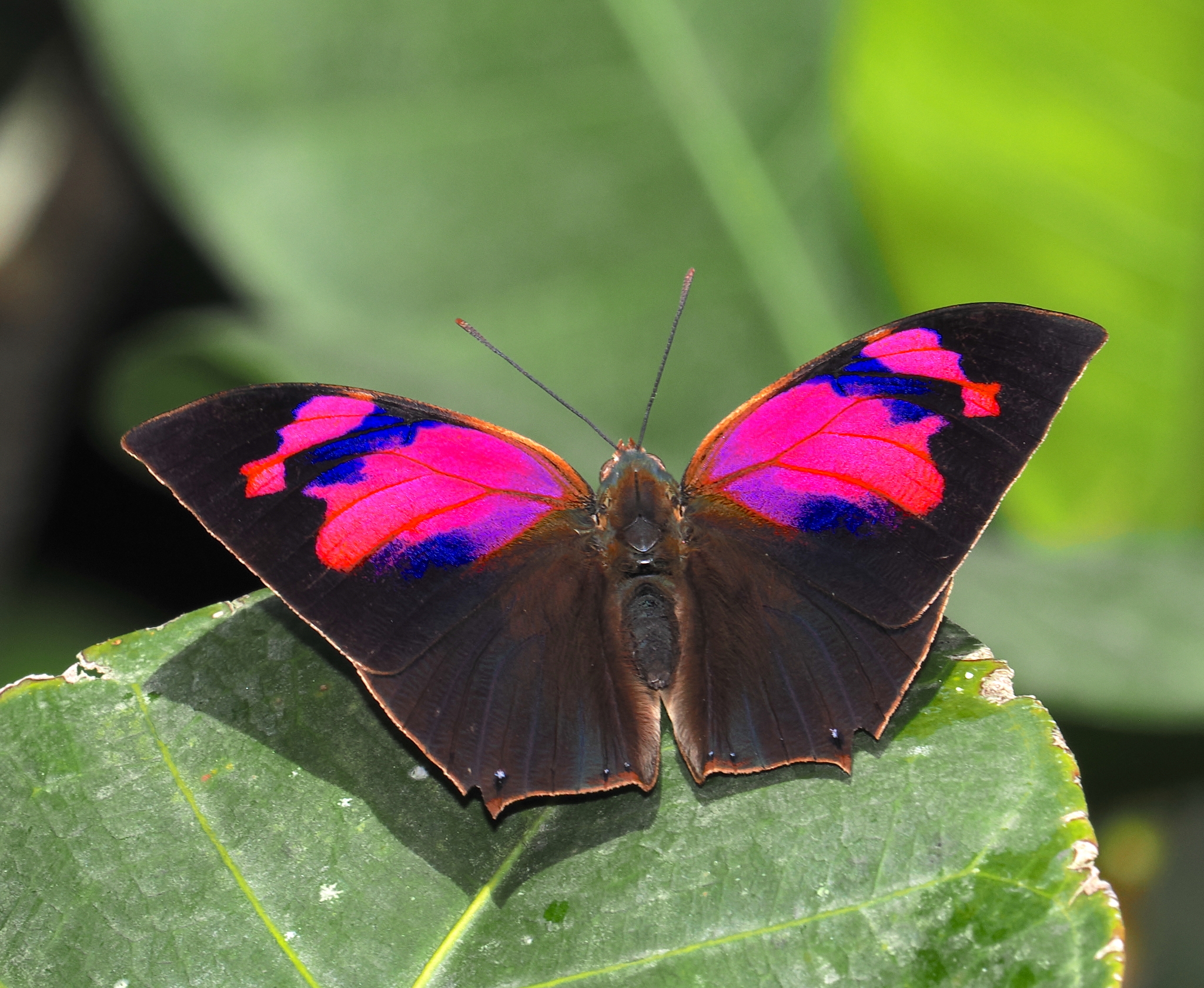

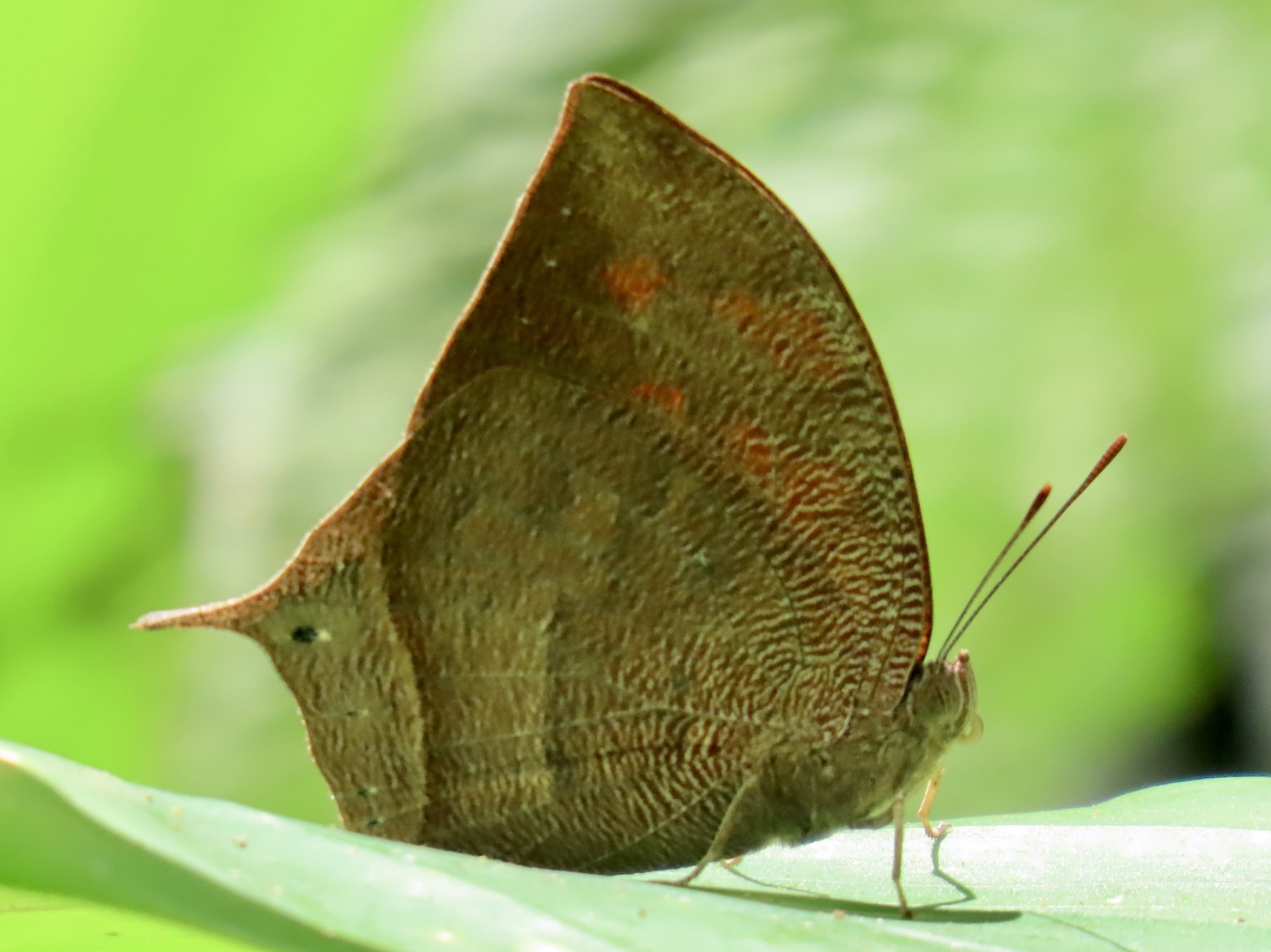

Scientific classification
- Kingdom: Animalia
- Phylum: Arthropoda
- Clade: Pancrustacea
- Class: Insecta
- Order: Lepidoptera
- Family: Nymphalidae
- Genus: Fountainea
- Species: F. nessus

Binomial name
- Fountainea nessus Latreille 1813

= Fountainea nessus =

Species of butterfly

Fountainea nessus, also known as the superb leafwing or Cindy's leafwing, is a Neotropical butterfly in the family Nymphalidae.

== Description ==
The adult butterfly's wings are mainly dark brown from the dorsal view, with pink and blue patches on the forewings of the male, the female instead has silver patches. The hindwings have several eyespots. The wings mimic dead leaves from the ventral view. Most of the body is brown.

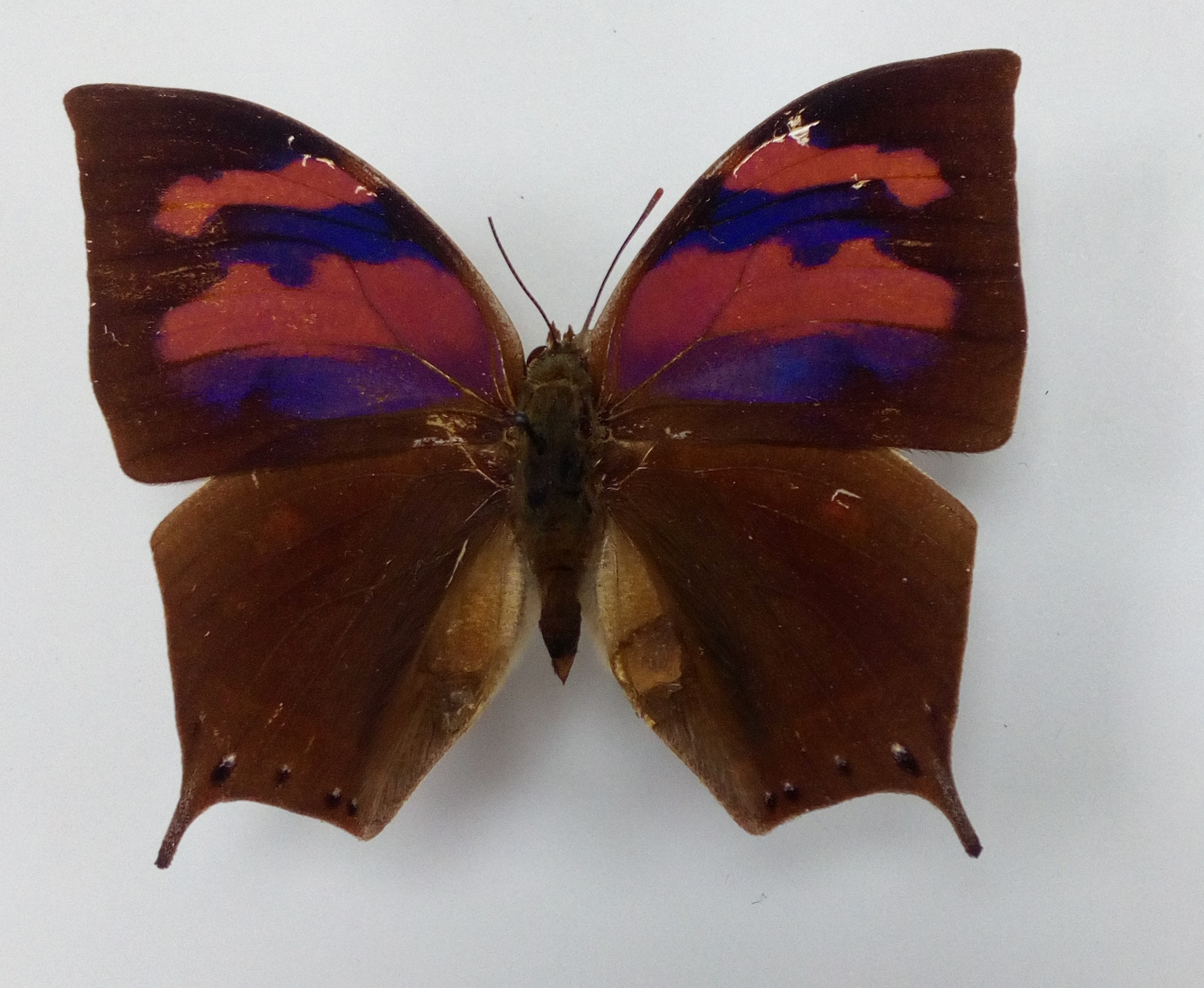
Preserved specimen

== Distribution ==
The butterfly can be found throughout South America. It lives in Colombia, Ecuador, Venezuela, and Peru.
