= Ryton Wood Meadows =

Ryton Wood Meadows is a reserve near Coventry in the county of Warwickshire, England. Butterfly Conservation owns and manages this reserve. It is 31 acres.
