= Snakeholme Pit =

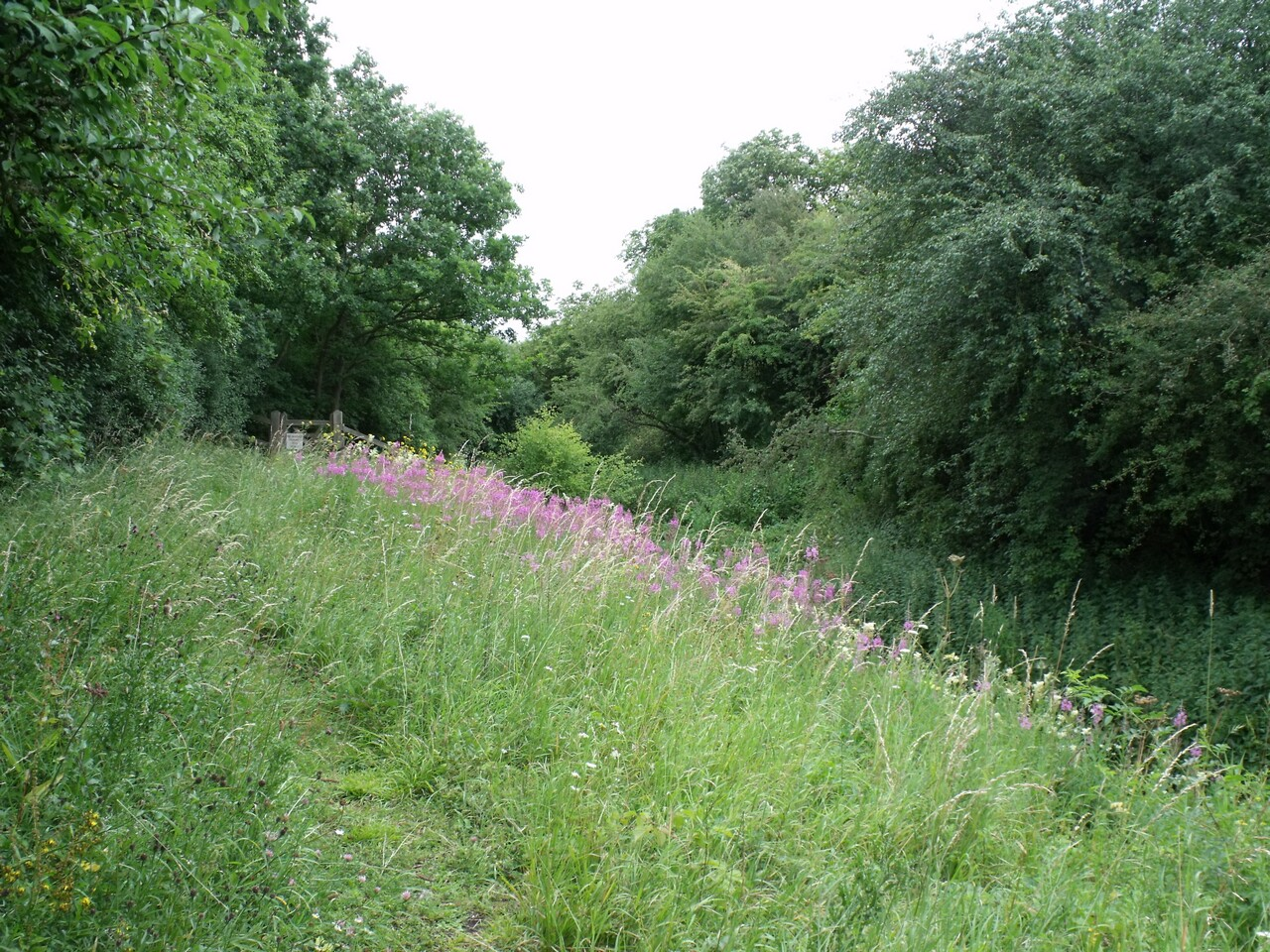

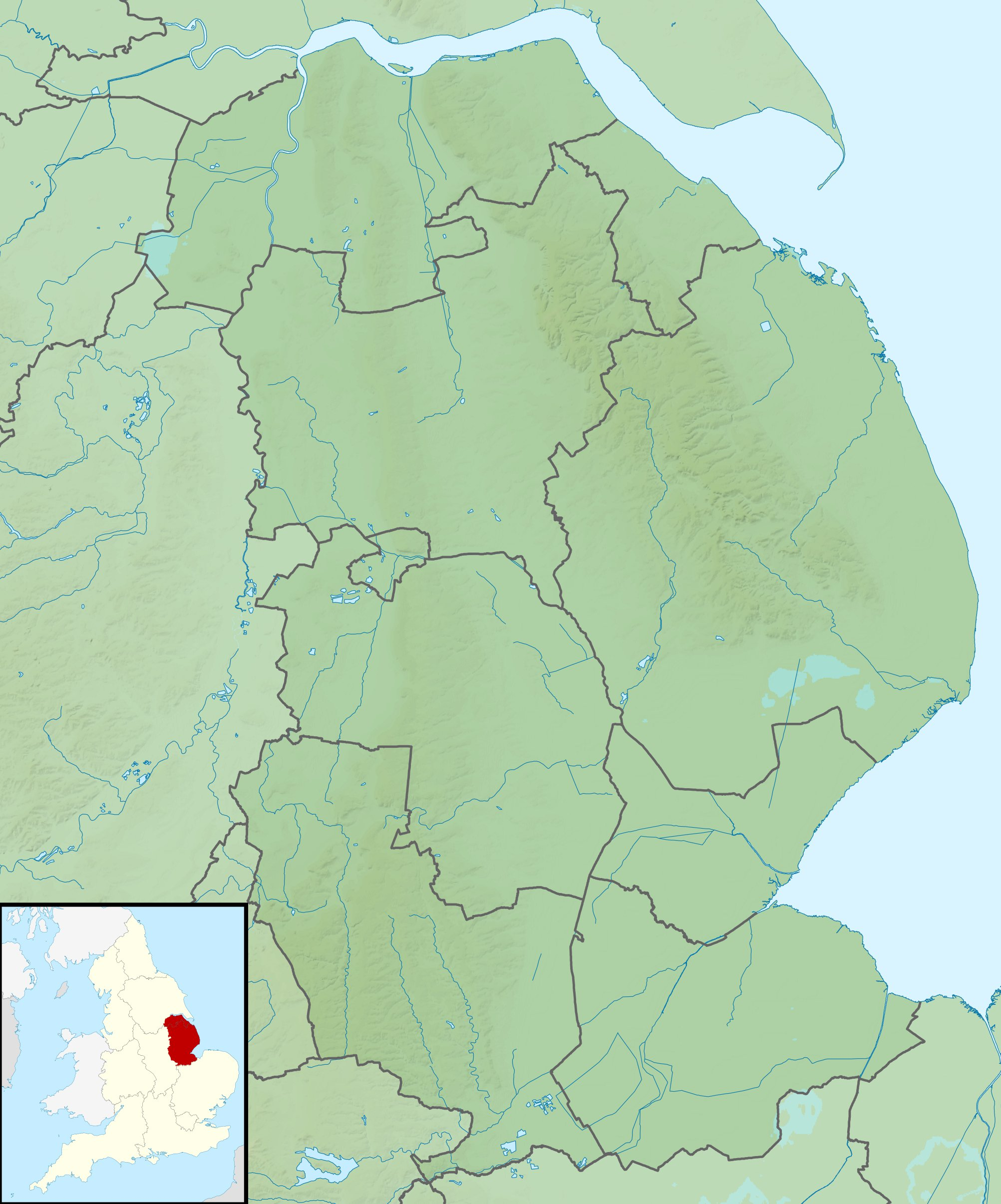
- Location within Lincolnshire
- Location: Langworth, Lincolnshire, England
- Coordinates: 53°13.7610′N 0°19.7152′W
- Area: 2 acres (0.81 ha)
- Created: 2013
- Owner: Butterfly Conservation

Snakeholme Pit is a nature reserve near Langworth in the county of Lincolnshire, England, managed and owned by Butterfly Conservation. It spans 2 acres.

Animals seen at Snakeholme Pit include the European water vole, the water shrew, the banded demoiselle, the common blue, the Essex skipper, the purple hairstreak, the emperor moth, the rosy footman and, the elephant hawk-moth.

The grassland is carefully managed by volunteers from the Lincoln Conservation Group.
