= William Fassnidge =

British entomologist

- Born: 7 January 1888; Chesham, Buckinghamshire, U.K.
- Died: 19 April 1949 (aged 61); Southampton, Hampshire, U.K.
- Occupation: Entomologist
- Years active: 1922–1949

William Fassnidge (7 January 1888. – 19 April 1949) F.R.E.S. was a British entomologist and language teacher.

Fassnidge's main interest area was Microlepidoptera, most particularly researching varieties of the moth Peronea cristana (now known as Acleris cristana).

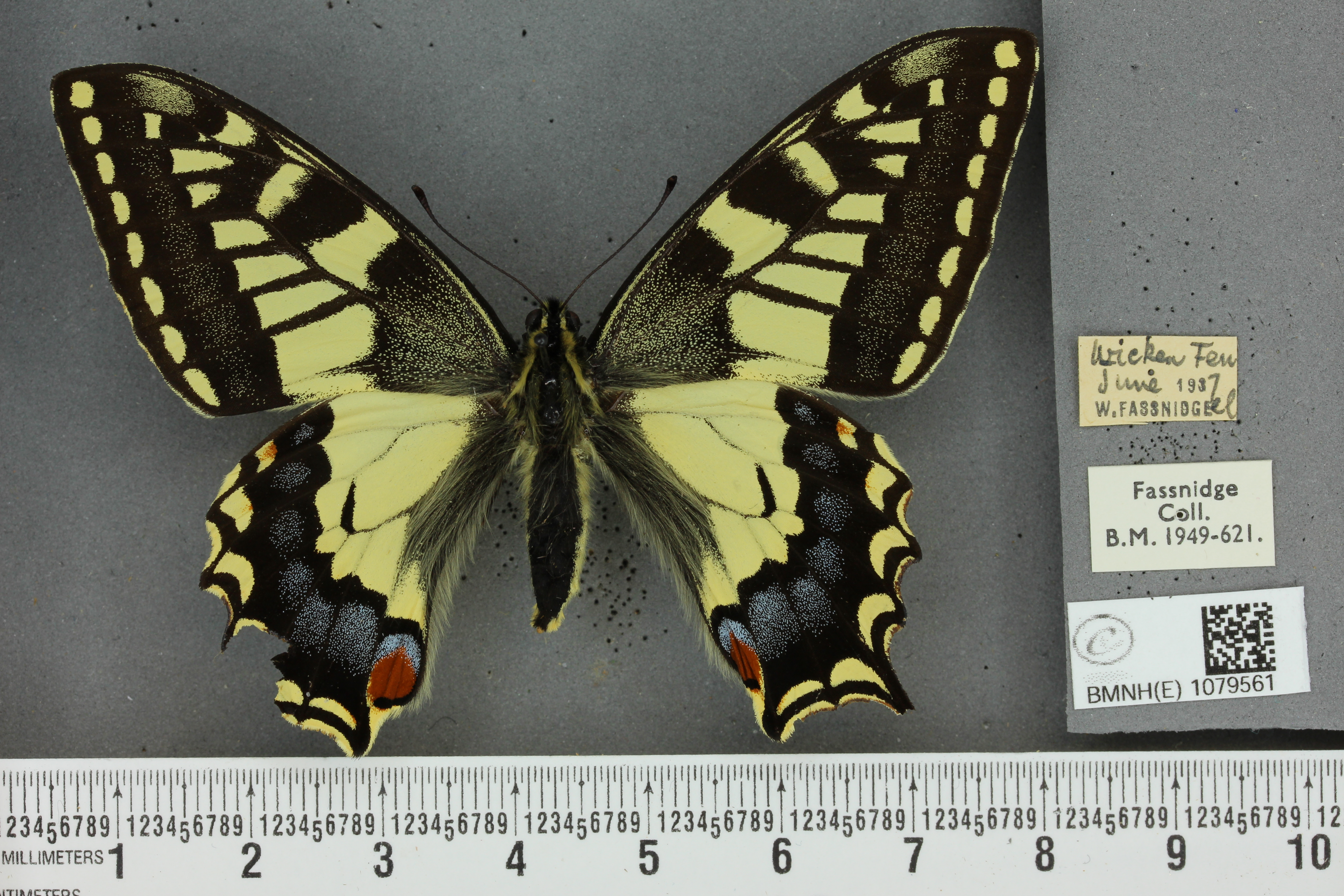
BMNHE 1079561, a specimen of the butterfly Papilio machaon britannicus Seitz, 1907 collected by William Fassnidge at Wicken Fen in June 1937

== Biography ==
Fassnidge was the third son of a carpenter and joiner, Samuel Fassnidge and his wife Annie (née Mary Ann Holloway) of Chesham, Buckinghamshire

On 11 May 1913 Fassnidge married Hilda Caroline Vasey (1884–1967) of Dunston on Tyne. They had one son, Claude William (1915–1995).

He was educated at St. Mark's College in Chelsea, London.

Fassnidge's regular employment was as a Modern Language Master at the King Edward VI School in Southampton (from c.1915–1945). One of Fassnidge's pupils for French was the future entomologist John Heath.

Fassnidge served as a Lieutenant in the King's Liverpool Regiment during WW1.

Fassnidge was a Francophile and made several study trips to France. In 1925 he travelled with his friend A.E. Burras to collect moths in the then-understudied and hard-to-access village of Auzat, returning again in 1927. Fassnidge also spent the Easter Holiday of 1930 in Dieulefit searching for the larvae of Aegeriadae (now Sesiidae).

Before the outbreak of World War 2, Fassnidge and his wife acted as hosts for refugees fleeing Germany, and during the conflict he served in the Home Guard.

== 'Friendly fire' accident and decline ==
In 1942, while on his Home Guard duties Fassnidge was badly injured during a demonstration Spitfire flight on Imber Down, Salisbury Plain when the pilot mistook a line of spectators for targets, shooting Fassnidge in a lung and the main artery of his left arm. Fassnidge was initially given two years to live, but recovered enough to continue with some entomological work, although he was only able to use his right arm while collecting. Hilda Fassnidge sometimes accompanied her husband on study trips in an attempt to prevent him straining himself, but Fassnidge's poor health after his injuries eventually resulted in his death.

== Legacy ==
After his death, Fassnidge's Microlepidoptera collection was purchased by the entomologist Stanley N.A. Jacobs, while his Macrolepidoptera collection was purchased by the British Museum. The Natural History Museum, London Library and Archives holds field notebooks and correspondence relating to Fassnidge's work.

== Selected publications ==
- Fassnidge, W. 1923. List of the Macro-lepidoptera, including the Pyrales, Crambi and Pterophorina of Hampshire and the Isle of Wight. The Entomologist's Record and Journal of Variation 35 (1-12): 1-16
- Fassnidge, W. 1926. A Month's Collecting in the Pyrenees. The Entomologist's Record and Journal of Variation XXVII (new series) (4): 49-52
- Fassnidge, W. 1928. Birds as enemies of mining larvae in South Hampshire. The Entomologist's Record and Journal of Variation XL (new series) (5): 70-78
- Fassnidge, W. 1931. Notes on three insects bred from Galls on Juniper. The Entomologist's Record and Journal of Variation XLIII (1): 34-36
- Fassnidge, W. 1938. Lepidoptera at Uvernet, Basses-Alpes, from 29 July to 8 September 1937. The Entomologist's Record and Journal of Variation L (12): 153-158
- Fassnidge, W. 1945. A Dorsetshire Locality for Peronea Cristana Fb. (Lep.) Journal of the Society for British Entomology 2 (7): 240
