= Prees Heath Common =

Coordinates: 52.927°N 2.657°W

Prees Heath Common is a nature reserve near Whitchurch in the county of Shropshire, England. Butterfly Conservation owns and manages this reserve. It comprises 145 acres (59 ha).
