= Park Corner Heath =

Biological site in Essex

Coordinates: 50.913°N 0.147°E

- Site of Special Scientific Interest
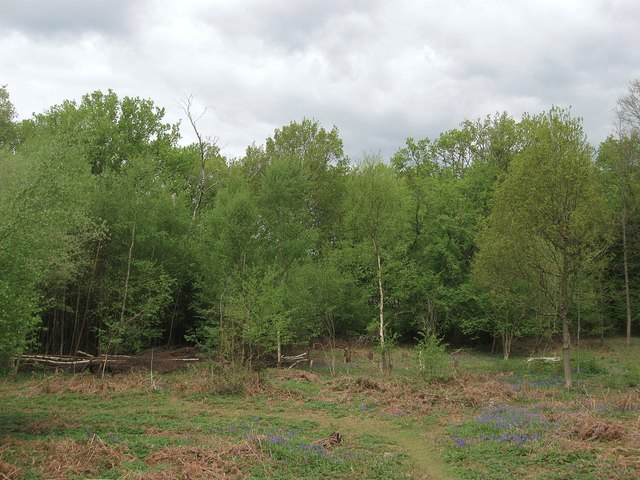
- Location of Park Corner Heath.
- Area of search: East Sussex
- Grid reference: TQ 510 148
- Interest: Biological
- Area: 2.9 hectares (7.2 acres)
- Notification date: 1988
- Location map: Magic Map

Park Corner Heath is a 2.9-hectare (7.2-acre) biological Site of Special Scientific Interest about 1.2 miles (2 km) south of East Hoathly, adjacent to the A22 main road between Uckfield and Eastbourne in East Sussex. It is managed by Butterfly Conservation.

== History ==
The reserve was originally established to protect the Lewes wave moth (Scopula immorata), now extirpated from Britain. It consists of grassy heath, woodland and scrub lying on sand over Weald Clay. Large parts of the woodland were planted with conifers in the latter part of the 20th century. As well as the main area of heathy grassland and a pond, it contains broad-leaved woodland of oak, birch and hornbeam, much managed as coppice. The reserve is the remnant of the more extensive heathland of Vert Wood and is now managed by Butterfly Conservation. Rowland Wood was added to the reserve in 2010.

== Natural history ==
The reserve supports an outstanding assemblage of moths and a varied butterfly fauna including several nationally scare species. Notable butterflies that may be seen are the small pearl-bordered fritillary, silver-washed fritillary, grizzled skipper and white admiral. Notable moths include the broad-bordered bee hawk-moth, eyed hawk-moth, elephant hawk-moth, pine hawk-moth and cream-spot tiger.

The two areas of woodland in the reserve are Lower Vert Wood and Upper Vert Wood. The former is a bluebell wood and the latter has a well-maintained bracken-covered heath at its centre, as well as a large pond. Next to this expanse of water is a small hut owned by Butterfly Conservation, an organisation that saved several local species from extinction at the hands of Victorian butterfly collectors. A book inside the hut is open for people to document what species they have seen. The heath is vital for several reptile species – if one is quiet one can see or hear adders slithering about or common lizards basking in the sun. In mammal terms, a family of red foxes has an earth and fallow deer can even be seen from a car as they dart across the road cutting through the trees. The nests of dormice in hibernation are dotted about the place in winter, and grey squirrels live in the trees. There are a lot of woodpigeons. Buzzards fly over the heath preying on the many songbirds that sing in the hedgerows and over the heath (including chiffchaffs) and leaving their distinctive messy grey pellets.
