= Insect Festival =

Insect Festival is a biennial series of one day events in the UK, organised by the Royal Entomological Society, to celebrate insects and entomology. The Festivals occur in alternate years to the Society's National Insect Week and consist of interactive exhibits and displays by insect related societies, charities, artists and companies.

The event was first held in 2006 and then in 2007 at York racecourse as an 'Entomological Exhibition' together with the Amateur Entomologist's Society. The Royal Entomological Society then organised the event and in 2009, 2011, 2013, 2015, 2017 and most recently in 2019 Insect Festival has been held in and around the Hospitium building in York Museum Gardens with over 1000 visitors attending.

In 2017 a second location was added in Bristol with the day being hosted in the foyer of Bristol Museum and Art Gallery, which was repeated in 2019 with some insect related events in the week leading up to the festival

The next Insect Festival will be in 2021.
