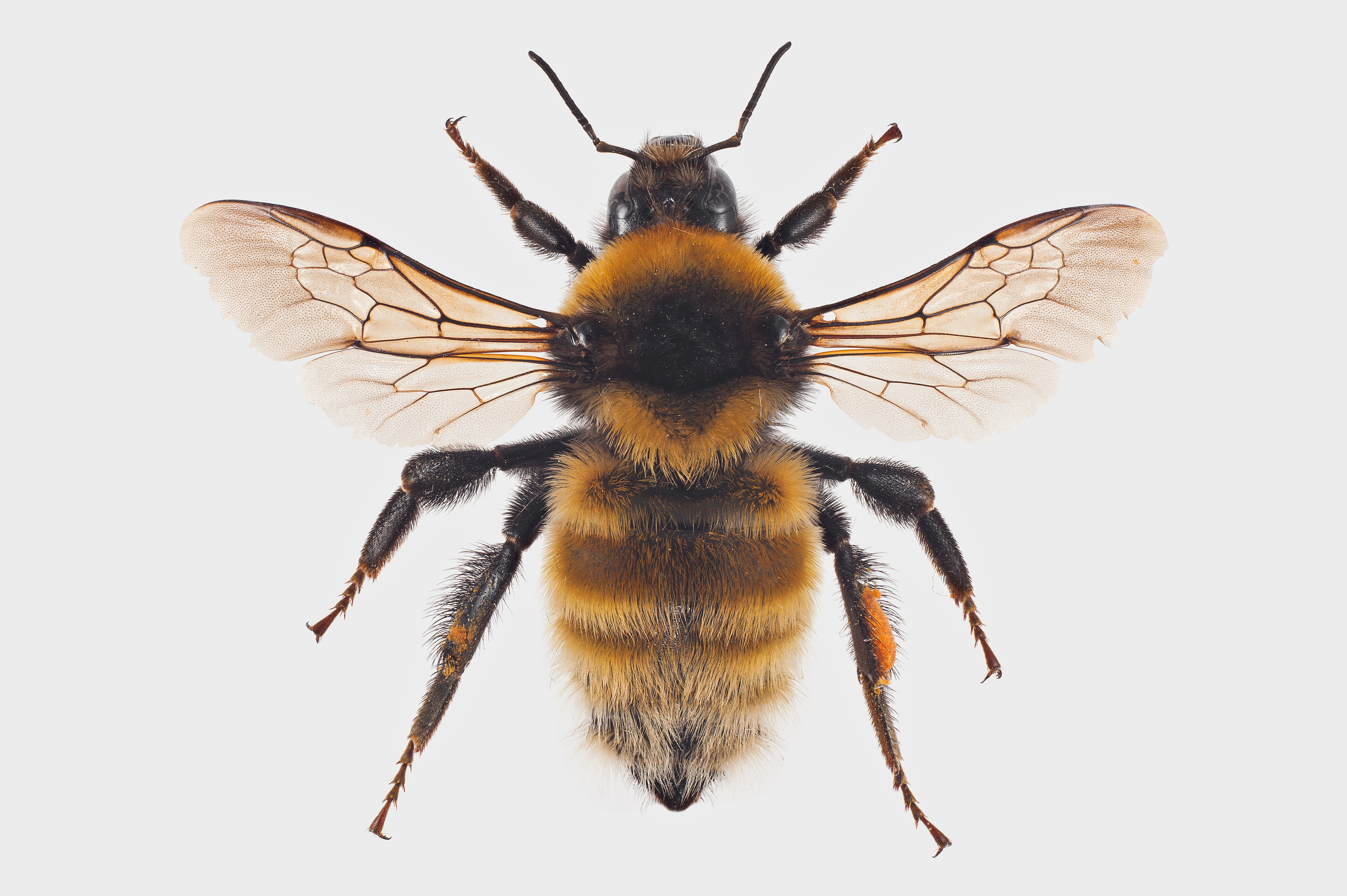

Scientific classification
- Domain: Eukaryota
- Kingdom: Animalia
- Phylum: Arthropoda
- Class: Insecta
- Order: Hymenoptera
- Family: Apidae
- Genus: Bombus
- Subgenus: Subterraneobombus
- Species: B. distinguendus

Binomial name
- Bombus distinguendus Morawitz, 1869

= Bombus distinguendus =

Species of bee

Bombus distinguendus, the great yellow bumblebee, is a species of bumblebee found in Austria, Belgium, the Czech Republic, Denmark, Finland, France, Germany, Great Britain, Hungary, Ireland, Lithuania, Poland, Romania, Slovakia, Switzerland, northern Russia, and Alaska.

It is an endangered species in Ireland. In Great Britain, it survives on the far north Highlands coast, Orkney, and the Western Isles.
