= Xerces Society =

Non-profit conservation organization

- Named after: Xerces blue
- Founded: December 9, 1971 (54 years ago)
- Founder: Robert Michael Pyle
- Type: 501(c)(3) non-profit
- Tax ID no.: 51-0175253
- Legal status: Foundation
- Purpose: Wildlife Conservation
- Headquarters: Portland, Oregon
- Region served: United States
- Methods: research, education, litigation
- Executive Director: Scott Black
- Website: xerces.org

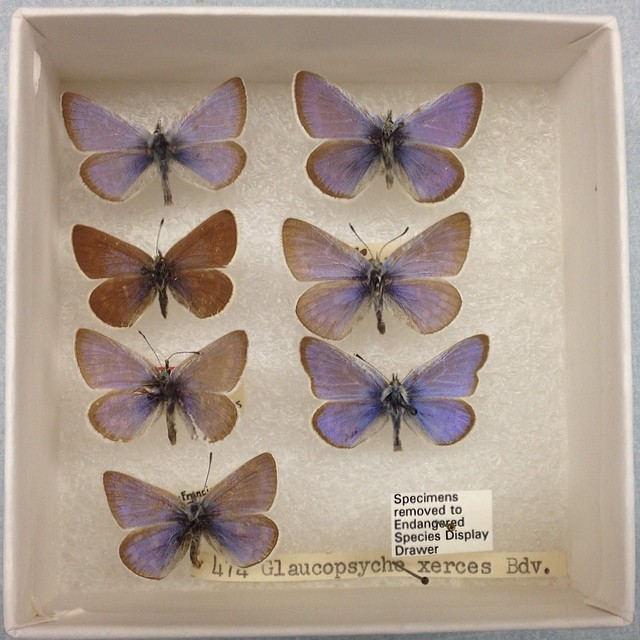
Samples of the extinct Glaucopsyche xerces butterfly in the collections of the Field Museum of Natural History

The Xerces Society for Invertebrate Conservation (Xerces Society) is a non-profit environmental organization that focuses on the conservation of invertebrates considered to be essential to biological diversity and ecosystem health. It is named in honor of an extinct California butterfly, the Xerces blue (Glaucopsyche xerces).

The Society collaborates with federal and state agencies including the US Department of Agriculture, as well as scientists, land managers, educators, and citizens to promote invertebrate conservation, applied research, advocacy, public outreach and education. Examples of Xerces Society activities include advocating for invertebrates and their habitats, petitioning for the designation of endangered status for applicable species such as the monarch butterfly, and public education projects. Ongoing projects include the rehabilitation of habitat for endangered species, public education about the importance of native pollinators, and the restoration and protection of watersheds.

The organization was founded by butterfly scientist Robert Michael Pyle from Yale School of Forestry & Environmental Studies and was reincorporated with the Oregon Secretary of State on April 14, 1988.

== Initiatives ==
=== Bee City USA ===
Bee City USA was founded in Asheville, North Carolina, in June 2012 by Phyllis Stiles. She and a steering committee of beekeepers concerned about pollinator declines designed the program to engage communities in taking action to provide habitat on public and private land. In 2018, Bee City USA merged with the Xerces Society to encourage cities to welcome native pollinators by planting more native plants, providing more pollinator habitats, and limiting unnecessary pesticide spraying. These measures benefit pollinating species such as native bees, moths, beetles, flies, and butterflies. These initiatives often focus on converting monoculture turfgrass into "pollinator lawns" or meadow-like habitats. Research indicates that such transitions are critical for urban nutrient budgeting and biodiversity, as reduced mowing frequencies and the integration of flowering forbs can significantly increase the abundance and richness of bee species compared to conventionally managed lawns.

=== Bee Campus USA ===
The Bee Campus USA program, is a sister program of Bee City USA, launched in 2015 to include pollinator gardens in communities and campuses to provide habitats for local pollinators.

The following colleges and universities participate in the Bee Campus USA program.

College	Date	Reference
Cal Poly Humboldt	2024	
Utah State University	2023	
University of Montana	2024	
University of New Hampshire	2024	
Indiana University Kokomo	2024	
West Virginia University	2024	
UC San Diego	2024	
Catawba College	2024	

== Litigation ==
In August 2024, the Xerces Society and Center for Biological Diversity won a lawsuit against the USDA's Animal and Plant Health Inspection Service (APHIS) over its widespread use of pesticides to address grasshopper and cricket infestations over millions of acres across 17 western states.

== Publications ==
- Publications Library
- Borders, Brianna; Lee–Mäder, Eric (2014). "Milkweeds: A Conservation Practitioner's Guide: Plant Ecology, Seed Production Methods, and Habitat Restoration Opportunities" (PDF). Portland, Oregon: The Xerces Society for Invertebrate Conservation. Archived (PDF) from the original on July 4, 2021.
- Mader, Eric; Shepherd, Mathew; Vaughan, Mace; Black, Scott Hoffman; LeBuhn, Gretchen (2011). Attracting Native Pollinators: Protecting North America's Bees and Butterflies: The Xerces Society guide. North Adams, Massachusetts: Storey Publishing. ISBN 9781603427470. LCCN 2010043054. OCLC 776997073 – via Internet Archive.
- The Xerces Society (2016). 100 Plants to Feed the Bees: Provide a Healthy Habitat to Help Pollinators Thrive. Storey Publishing. ISBN 978-1-6121-2701-9. LCCN 2016017164. OCLC 946579610. Archived from the original on December 2, 2017.

== See also ==
- Buglife
- Bumblebee Conservation Trust
- Butterfly Conservation
- Decline in insect populations
- Insect Week
- Pollinator Partnership
