= Canadian Pollination Initiative =

The Canadian Pollination Initiative (NSERC-CANPOLIN) is one of nine new Strategic Networks announced in September 2009 and supported by the Natural Sciences and Engineering Research Council of Canada (NSERC). NSERC-CANPOLIN has funding for five years to address a perceived decline in pollinators in both agricultural and natural ecosystems in Canada. At present 26 universities and a number of government agencies, NGOs, and industry groups are involved. The CANPOLIN website is currently hosted at the University of Guelph.

According to the About page:

"Over the five-year life of the Network, NSERC-CANPOLIN will make major contributions to the conservation of pollinator and plant biodiversity, improve the health of managed bees, enhance pollination by native pollinators and increase our knowledge of flower/pollinator interactions and gene flow in plants. The Network will also provide critical information on the economic aspects of pollination and future management needs based on expected changes in climate and land use. Ultimately, the information gained by the Network will provide policy makers and the wider public with the necessary tools to better protect and conserve some of Canada's most important natural resources."
