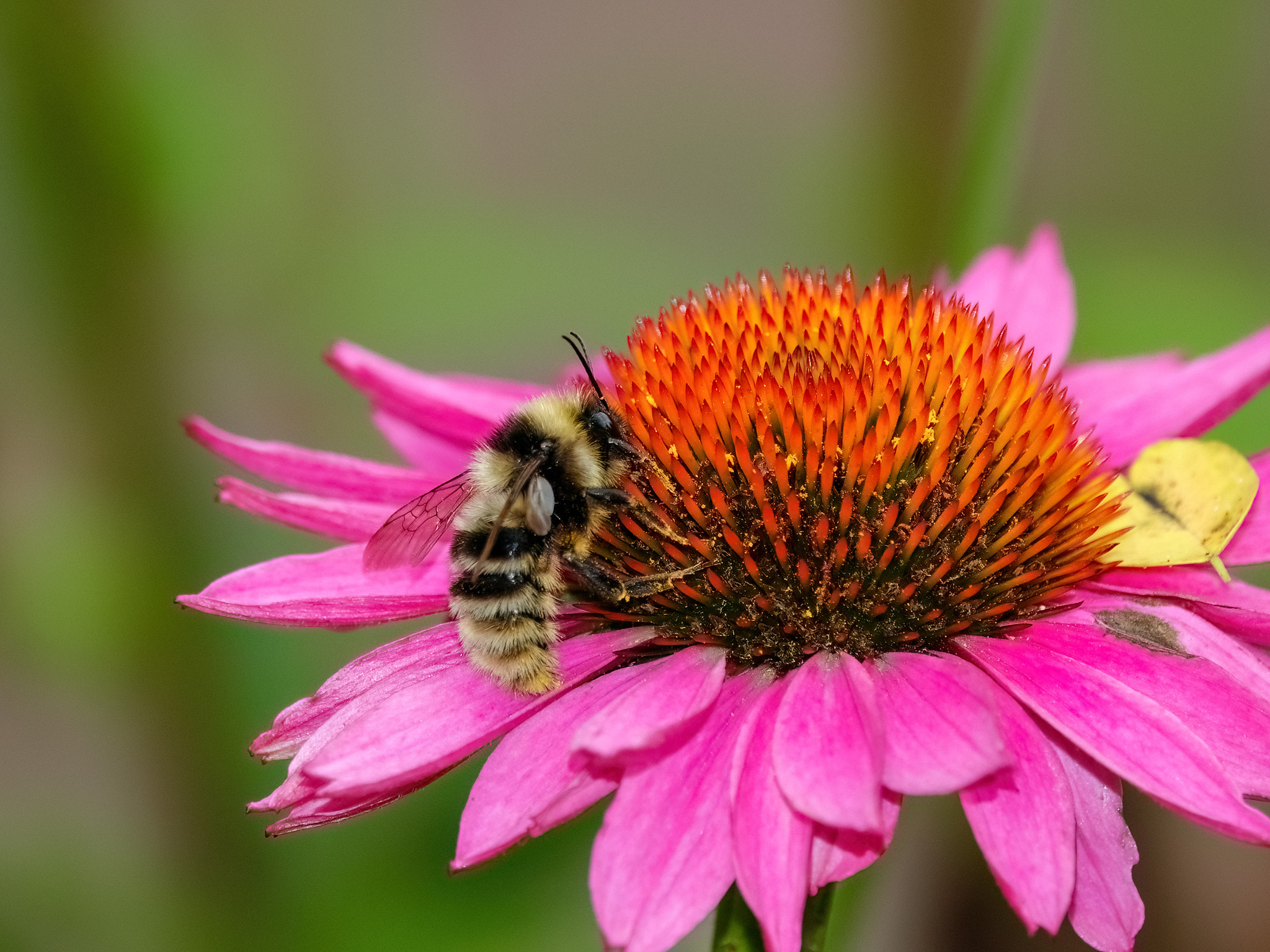
- Lund, Sweden, 2022

Scientific classification
- Kingdom: Animalia
- Phylum: Arthropoda
- Clade: Pancrustacea
- Class: Insecta
- Order: Hymenoptera
- Family: Apidae
- Genus: Bombus
- Subgenus: Subterraneobombus
- Species: B. subterraneus

Binomial name
- Bombus subterraneus (Linnaeus, 1758)

= Short-haired bumblebee =

Species of bee

The short-haired bumblebee (Bombus subterraneus), or short-haired humble-bee, is a species of bumblebee found in Eurasia, as well as in New Zealand, where it is an introduced species.

It lived in the British Isles among other parts of Europe. This species became extinct in the British Isles in 1989. The cause of its sudden extinction is debated, but many scientists believe that it was due to a lack of genetic diversity.

== Introduction and reintroduction ==
The short-haired bumblebee was one of four species of bumblebee introduced into New Zealand from the United Kingdom between 1885 and 1906 for pollination of red clover. In New Zealand, it is the rarest of the four species, with small numbers at a few locations in inland South Island. The last recorded sighting in the United Kingdom was in 1988 and was considered to be extirpated from there until re-introduced. A programme was started in 2009 to reintroduce it to the United Kingdom with queen bees from New Zealand. The programme was run by Natural England, the Bumblebee Conservation Trust, the Royal Society for the Protection of Birds and bee and wasp charity Hymettus. However, this was not a success, as many of the queens died during hibernation. DNA analysis of the New Zealand bees showed they lacked genetic diversity. In 2012, a second attempt was made to reintroduce the short-haired bumblebee using queens from Skåne province of southern Sweden. By the summer of 2013, workers of the species were found within 5 kilometres of the reintroduction site, showing that nesting had been successful. The project continued collecting bumblebee queens from Skåne until the spring of 2016, to get a genetic span.
