= Jeremy A. Thomas =

British ecologist

Jeremy A. Thomas OBE
- Born: Jeremy Ambler Thomas
- Known for: Research on functional and evolutionary ecology of insects
- Scientific career
- Fields: Ecology
- Institutions: NERC’s Institute of Terrestrial Ecology

Jeremy Ambler Thomas OBE is a British ecologist noted for his work on the population, community, functional and evolutionary ecology of insects.

Thomas is an emeritus professor of ecology and professorial fellow of New College, University of Oxford. He graduated from Cambridge University in 1969 and undertook a PhD based at The Nature Conservancy’s (NERC) Monks Wood Experimental Station. He spent 30 years leading research groups and later sections at NERC’s Institute of Terrestrial Ecology (ITE) and Centre for Ecology & Hydrology (CEH) labs. He was also director and head of Station of NERC’s CEH Dorset laboratory (2003-2007). In 2007, Thomas moved to Oxford as professor of ecology. Other appointments include serving as president of the Royal Entomological Society (2012–14), a Helmholtz International Fellow, a visiting professor at the University of Reading, and a professorial fellow of the Centre for Ecology and Hydrology.
