= North American Pollinator Protection Campaign =

Organization for the conservation of pollinators

The North American Pollinator Protection Campaign (NAPPC) is an organization of academics, government officials, policy makers, and industry stakeholders working towards pollinator conservation in North America.

NAPPC works in coordination with local, national, and international pollinator protection plans that focus on species, genera, families, or classes of animals. The campaign coordinates with existing projects that address pollinator habitats or migratory corridors. Such plans include Bat Conservation International’s Management Plan, the Plant Conservation Alliance’s Plan, and the São Paulo Declaration on Pollinators .

NAPPC complements these and other pollinator conservation efforts in that it focuses on pollinator protection in the United States, Canada, and Mexico, and addresses species including invertebrates, birds, and mammals. NAPPC coordinates with existing pollinator protection plans to avoid duplication, use resources effectively and replicate proposals in new venues. The NAPPC Action Plan builds on scientific research concerning pollinators and pollinator habitats and promotes and supports pollinator research.

== Pollinators in peril ==
Possible declines in the health and population of pollinators pose a threat to the integrity of biodiversity, to global food webs, and to human health. Factors which could contribute to declines include:

- improper use of pesticides and herbicides,
- habitat fragmentation,
- loss and degradation causing a reduction of food sources and sites for mating, nesting, roosting, and migration,
- aggressive competition from non-native species,
- disease, predators, and parasites,
- climate change,
- lack of floral diversity.

The importance of pollinator services to ecosystem and economic health is well documented. Animal pollinators are needed for the reproduction of 90% of flowering plants and one third of human food crops Domestic honeybees pollinate approximately $10 billion worth of crops in the U.S. each year. Bee poisonings from pesticides result in annual losses of $14.3 million. Pollinators support biodiversity, as there is a positive correlation between plant diversity and pollinator diversity.

The elimination, replacement or reduction of a pollinator may result in the decline of a plant species, which in turn may affect plant abundance, and hence community dynamics and impact wild animals and humans that depend on those plants.

== Goal ==
The major goal of the alliance of pollinator researchers, conservation and environmental groups, private industry, and state and federal agencies, is to implement an action plan to:

- coordinate local, national, and international projects in the areas of pollinator research, education and awareness, conservation and restoration, policies and practices, and partnership initiatives,
- aid communication among stakeholders, build coalitions, and leverage existing resources,
- demonstrate a positive measurable impact on the populations and health of pollinating animals within five years.

== History ==
In recognition of the significance of a stable pollinator population, the Pollinator Partnership (formerly the Coevolution Institute) collaborating with the National Fish & Wildlife Foundation established the North American Pollinator Protection Campaign (NAPPC) in 1999.

Since its founding, the NAPPC has focused attention on the plight of pollinators and the need to protect them throughout the U.S., Canada, and Mexico. Two such efforts were the NAPPC Strategic Planning Conferences at the National Academy of Sciences in Washington, DC. These two conferences resulted in a blueprint for pollinator protection.

== Accomplishments ==
- The U.S. Postal Service introduces a "Pollination" stamp series released in June 2007.
- The U.S. Senate passed a Resolution to protect pollinators and designates June 24–30, 2007 National Pollinator Week.
- "Nature's Partners", a pollinator curriculum for Grades 3-6 introduced
- First-ever pollinator provision written into the 2008 Farm Bill.

== Pollinator awards ==
Each year, NAPPC and the Pollinator Partnership present awards to individuals whose actions have made them notable as pollinators in Canada, the United States, and Mexico. Past awardees include:

2011

- Dra. M. Isabel Ramirez, Mexico
- Clement Kent, Ph.D., Canada
- Pete and Laura Berthelsen, Farmer-Rancher Award
- Jimmy Brown, USA

2010

- Tammy Horn, Ph.D., USA
- Musée de l’abeille, Canada
- Sabrina Malach, Canada
- Humberto Berlanga, Mexico
- Alcee L. Hasting, U.S. House of Representatives, USA

2009

- Juan Francisco Ornelas, Ph.D, Instituto de Ecología A.C., Mexico
- Homer Woodward
- Jasper Wyman and Son, Canada
- Sam Earnshaw, Community Alliance with Family Farmers
- Honorable Earl Blumenauer, U.S. House of Representatives

2008

- José Sarakhan, Ph. D. UNAM, Mexico
- Kevin Carver, Prince Edward Island, Canada
- Dave White, NRCS – Montana State Conservationist

2007

- José Ignacio Cuadriello Aguilar, Universidad de Guadalajara, Mexico
- Vicki Beard, City of Guelph, Ontario, Canada
- Jim Wiker, Illinois Natural History Survey

2006

- Jim Dyer, Environment Canada
- Francisco Molina, Ph.D., National University of Mexico
- Betsy Croker, Ph.D., Senate Committee on Agriculture
- Vincent J. Tepedino, Ph.D., USDA

2005

- Dale Bosworth, U.S. Forest Service
- Bruce Knight, USDA NRCS
- Ron Krystynak, Canadian Embassy
- Don Pedro Cahun Uh, Tihosuco, Mexico
