= Bentley Station Meadow =

Site of Special Scientific Interest in UK

Coordinates: 51.180°N 0.867°W

- Site of Special Scientific Interest
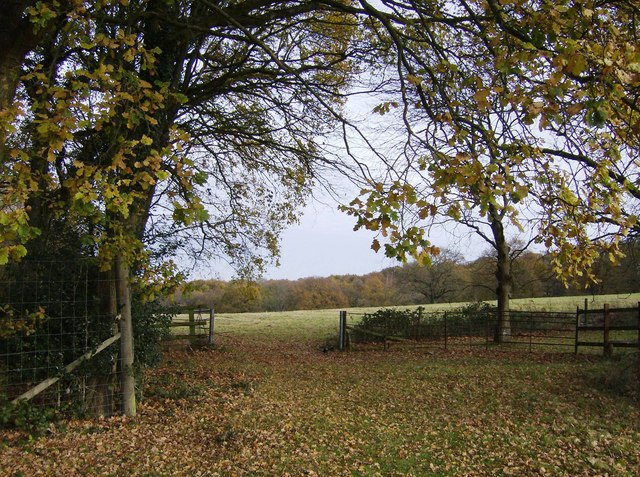
- Location of Bentley Station Meadow.
- Area of search: Hampshire
- Grid reference: SU 793 429
- Interest: Biological
- Area: 5.2 hectares (13 acres)
- Notification date: 1992
- Location map: Magic Map

Bentley Station Meadow is a 5.2-hectare (13-acre) biological Site of Special Scientific Interest south of Bentley in Hampshire.

This area of unimproved herb-rich grassland is dominated by cock's-foot, Yorkshire fog and tufted hairgrass. There is a very rich invertebrate fauna, especially hoverflies and butterflies. Hoverflies include the uncommon Sphaerophoria taeniata and Xanthogramma citrofasiatum, while there are 22 species of breeding butterflies.

A public footpath to Bentley railway station goes through the meadow.

Part of the land area designated as Bentley Station Meadow is owned by the Forestry Commission.
