= Insect Week =

UK initiative on importance of insects and entomology

Insect Week (formerly National Insect Week) is an initiative originating in the UK. Usually held during the last week of June, the aim is to engage the general public with the importance of insects and entomology. The week is organised by Luke Tilley at the Royal Entomological Society, as well as Insect Festival, and is supported by a large number of partner organisations concerned with insect science, natural history and conservation. The week consists of hundreds of events and activities across the UK, allowing the public to discover insects and meet the entomologists that study them. The popular Insect Week Photography Competition is launched during the week and attracts entries from large numbers of amateur photographers. As well as promoting the importance of insect science to the wider public, Insect Week particularly aims to encourage young people into entomology.

Past Insect Week campaigns have been endorsed by the Prince of Wales, Prof David Bellamy OBE, Chris Packham, Kate Humble and Mike Dilger, in 2014 the week was launched by Jonathan Ross. In 2022 to mark the start of the week, Writers Rebel's Paint the Land team produced a short film, Almost Invisible Angels, based on Jay Griffiths's dreamtime, narrated by Sir Mark Rylance.

The next Insect Week will be 21-27 June 2027.

== See also ==
- Royal Entomological Society
- Danny Beath
- Amateur Entomologists' Society
- Buglife
- Xerces Society
