= Mike Dilger =

British ecologist and television presenter (born 1966)

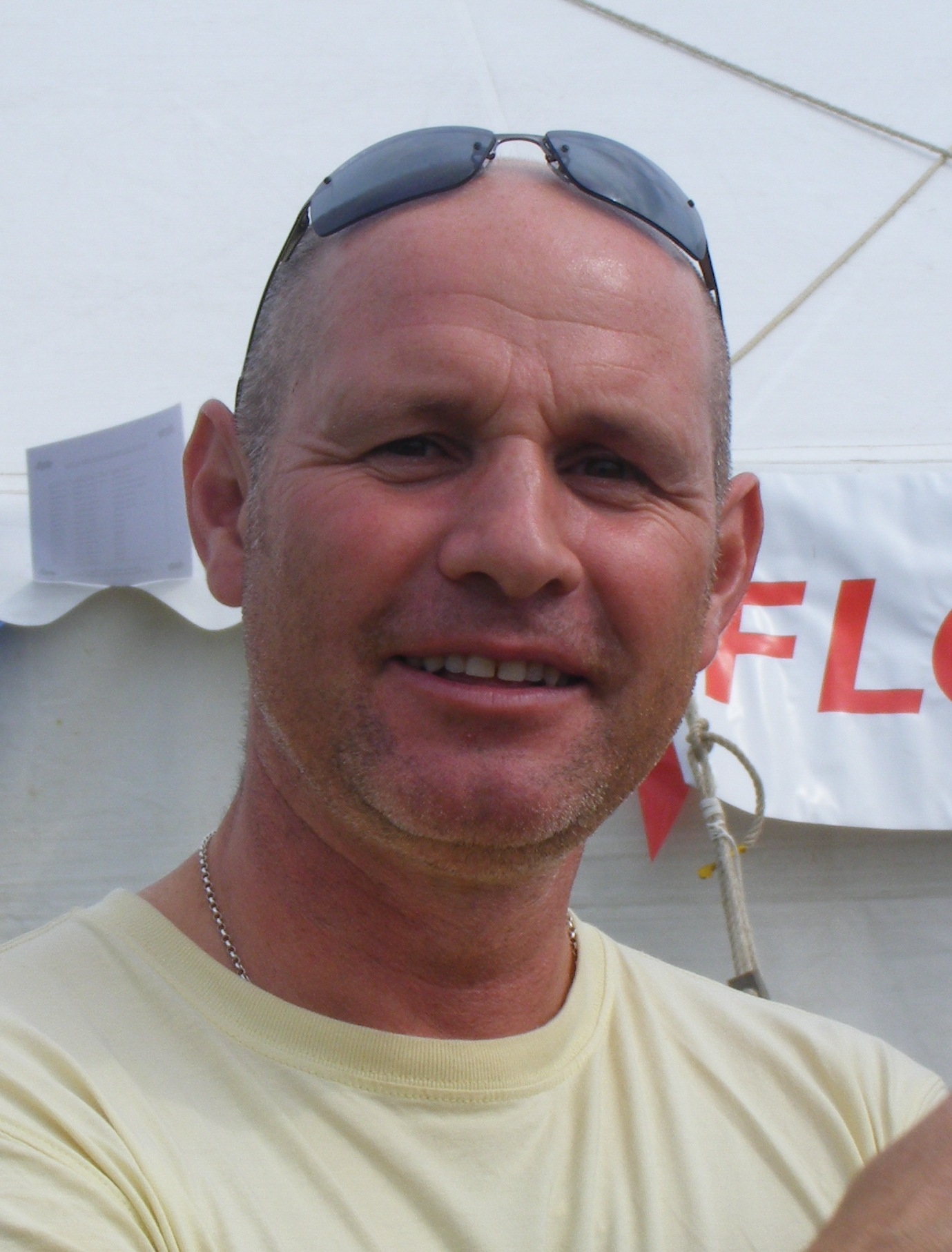
- Born: Mike Dilger; 7 November 1966 (age 59); Stafford, England
- Occupations: Ecologist, presenter
- Employer: BBC
- Dilger's voice recorded September 2016
- Website: http://www.mikedilger.co.uk

Mike Dilger (born 7 November 1966) is an English ecologist, television presenter and the wildlife reporter on the BBC television programme The One Show. He attended the University of Nottingham and UCNW Bangor in north Wales.

He has lived in Bristol for 10 years since returning from an extensive period working in Vietnam, Tanzania and Ecuador as a field biologist.

== Career ==
=== Television ===
- Presenter of over 250 items for The One Show on BBC One from spring 2007 to present
- Reporter for Inside Out on BBC One for various regions from autumn 2004 to present
- Presenter on Nature's Top 40 on BBC Two in December 2008
- Presenter on Wild Gardens for ITV in July 2008
- Presenter on Nature's Calendar on BBC Two in Autumn 2006
- Presenter on CBeebies Autumnwatch in Autumn 2006 and CBeebies Springwatch in spring 2007
- Presenter on the Nature of Britain on BBC One West in autumn 2007
- Presenter for Hands on Nature on BBC Two in November 2005
- Reporter on Springwatch with Bill Oddie 2005 on BBC Two from 30 May to 16 June 2005
- On screen contributor for British Isles: A Living History on BBC One from October to November 2004
- On screen Wildlife Expert for The Terry & Gaby Show on Channel 5 in 2004
- On screen Contributor for Britain Goes Wild in May & June 2004
- Presenter for Wildlife Uncovered: UK on Channel 5 in April 2002, June 2002 & March 2003
- Presenter for The Natural History of Christmas on Channel 5 in December 2001 & repeated 2003
- Presenter for Britain's Wild Invaders on Channel 5 in August 2000 & repeated December 2003

=== Radio ===
- Contributor on a wide range of wildlife series on BBC Radio 4 from 2006 to present
- Presenter on Extreme Britain on BBC Radio 4 from February to March 2006
- Presenter on Wild Underground on BBC Radio 4 in December 2003

== Books ==
- One Thousand Shades of Green Bloomsbury, 2023. ISBN 1472993632
- Nightingales in November Bloomsbury, 2016. ISBN 1472962427
- My Garden And Other Animals Collins, 2012. ISBN 978-0-00-745770-0
- Nature's Top 40: Britain's Best Wildlife. Collins, 2008. ISBN 978-0-00-727591-5
- Nature's Babies. Collins, 2008. ISBN 978-0-00-727926-5
