= The Entomologist's Record and Journal of Variation =

- Discipline: Entomology
- Language: English

Publication details
- History: 1890–present
- Publisher: Amateur Entomologists' Society (United Kingdom)
- Frequency: Bimonthly

Standard abbreviations
- ISO 4: Entomol.'s Rec. J. Var.

Indexing
- ISSN: 0013-8916

Links
- Journal homepage

The Entomologist's Record and Journal of Variation is a bimonthly peer-reviewed entomological journal. Its emphasis is British and European Lepidoptera, but material on other insect orders is also published regularly. It was established by J. W. Tutt in 1890. Its current editor is Colin W. Plant. Two long-running series featured in the journal are the annual reports on immigration of Lepidoptera into the British Isles, and an annual review of the Microlepidoptera recorded from Britain. The Entomologist's Record and Journal of Variation became a publication of the Amateur Entomologists' Society in January 2009.
