= Biodiversity loss =

Extinction of species or loss of species in a given habitat

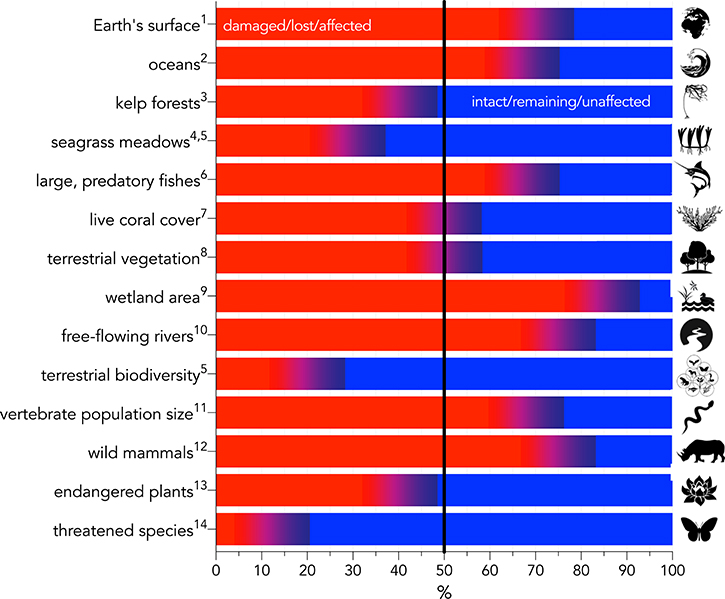
Summary of major environmental-change categories that cause biodiversity loss. The data is expressed as a percentage of human-driven change (in red) relative to baseline (blue), as of 2021. Red indicates the percentage of the category that is damaged, lost, or otherwise affected, whereas blue indicates the percentage that is intact, remaining, or otherwise unaffected.

Biodiversity loss happens when species disappear completely from Earth (extinction) or when there is a decrease or disappearance of species in a specific area. Biodiversity loss means that there is a reduction in biological diversity in a given area. The decrease can be temporary or permanent. It is temporary if the damage that led to the loss is reversible in time, for example through ecological restoration.If this is not possible, then the decrease is permanent. The cause of most of the biodiversity loss is, generally speaking, human activities that push the planetary boundaries too far. These activities include habitat destruction (for example deforestation) and land use intensification (for example monoculture farming). Further problem areas are air and water pollution (including nutrient pollution), over-exploitation, invasive species and climate change.

Many scientists, along with the Global Assessment Report on Biodiversity and Ecosystem Services, say that the main reason for biodiversity loss is a growing human population because this leads to human overpopulation and excessive consumption. Others disagree, saying that loss of habitat is caused mainly by "the growth of commodities for export" and that population has little to do with overall consumption. More important are wealth disparities between and within countries. In any case, all contemporary biodiversity loss has been attributed to human activities.

Climate change is another threat to global biodiversity. For example, coral reefs—which are biodiversity hotspots—will be lost by the year 2100 if global warming continues at the current rate. Additionally, the change of temperatures are likely to increase fire activity driving events such as forest fires. Still, it is the general habitat destruction (often for expansion of agriculture), not climate change, that is currently the bigger driver of biodiversity loss. Invasive species and other disturbances have become more common in forests in the last several decades. These tend to be directly or indirectly connected to climate change and can cause a deterioration of forest ecosystems.

Groups that care about the environment have been working for many years to stop the decrease in biodiversity. Nowadays, many global policies include activities to stop biodiversity loss. For example, the UN Convention on Biological Diversity aims to prevent biodiversity loss and to conserve wilderness areas. However, a 2020 United Nations Environment Programme report found that most of these efforts had failed to meet their goals. For example, of the 20 biodiversity goals laid out by the Aichi Biodiversity Targets in 2010, only six were "partially achieved" by 2020.

This ongoing global extinction is also called the holocene extinction or sixth mass extinction.

== Global estimates across all species ==
Red list categories of the IUCN

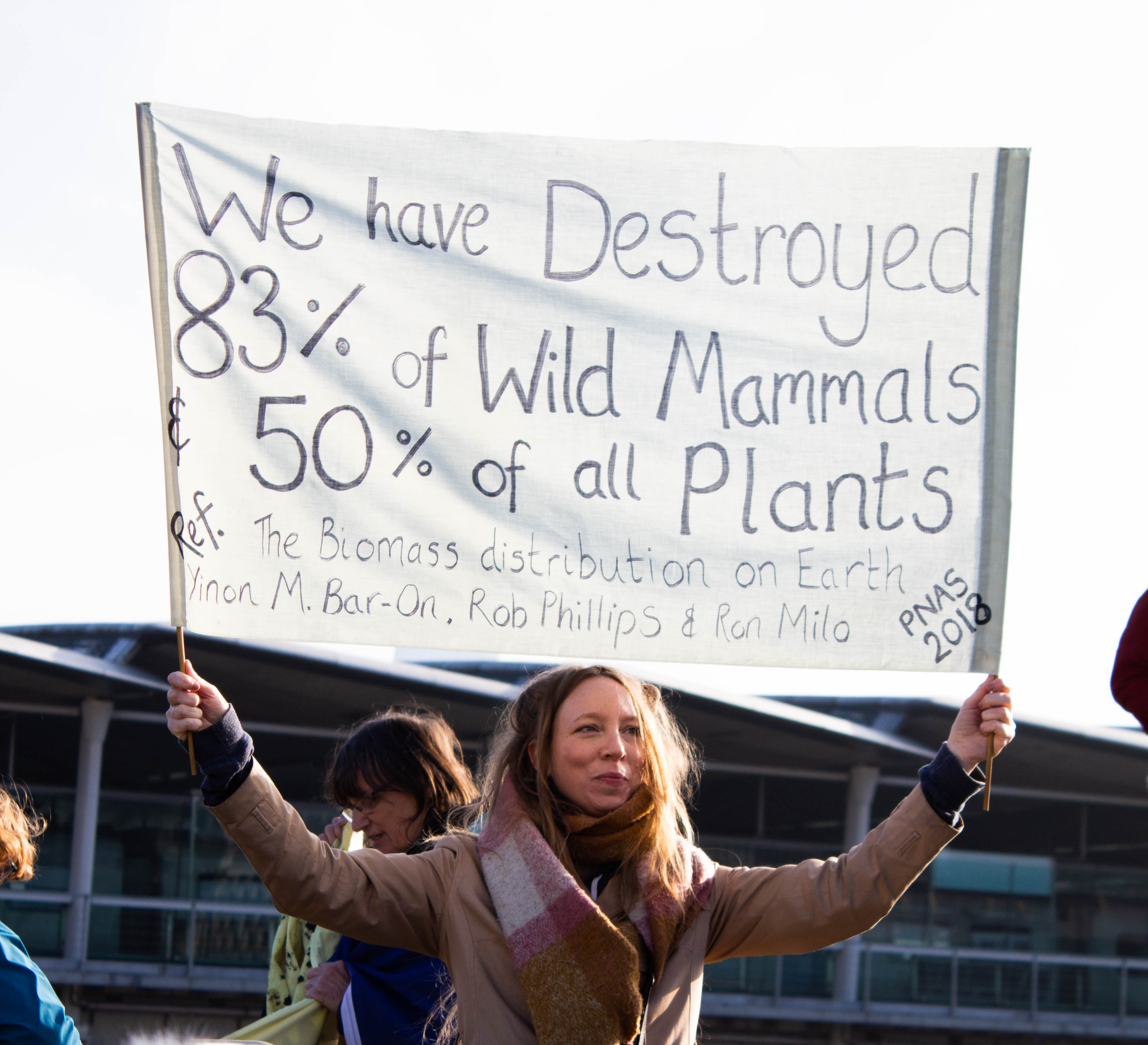
Demonstrator against biodiversity loss, at Extinction Rebellion (2018).

The current rate of global biodiversity loss is estimated to be 100 to 1000 times higher than the (naturally occurring) background extinction rate, faster than at any other time in human history, and is expected to grow in the upcoming years. The fast-growing extinction trends of various animal groups like mammals, birds, reptiles, amphibians, and fish have led scientists to declare a current biodiversity crisis in both land and ocean ecosystems.

In 2006, many more species were formally classified as rare or endangered or threatened; moreover, scientists have estimated that millions more species are at risk that have not been formally recognized. There is also evidence showing that species which are not formally recognized are at greater risk of extinction.

Deforestation also plays a large role in biodiversity loss. More than half of the world's biodiversity is hosted in tropical rainforest. Regions that are subjected to exponential loss of biodiversity are referred to as biodiversity hotspots. Since 1988 the hotspots increased from 10 to 34. Of the total 34 hotspots currently present, 16 of them are in tropical regions (as of 2006). Researchers have noted in 2006 that only 2.3% of the world is covered with biodiversity loss hotspots, and even though only a small percentage of the world is covered in hotspots, it host a large fraction (50%) of vascular plant species.

In 2021, about 28 percent of the 134,400 species assessed using the IUCN Red List criteria are now listed as threatened with extinction—a total of 37,400 species compared to 16,119 threatened species in 2006.

A 2022 study that surveyed more than 3,000 experts found that "global biodiversity loss and its impacts may be greater than previously thought", and estimated that roughly 30% of species "have been globally threatened or driven extinct since the year 1500."

Research published in 2023 found that, out of 70,000 species, about 48% are facing decreasing populations due to human activities, while only 3% are seeing an increase in populations.

== Methods to quantify loss ==
Biologists define biodiversity as the "totality of genes, species and ecosystems of a region". To measure biodiversity loss rates for a particular location, scientists record the species richness and its variation over time in that area. In ecology, local abundance is the relative representation of a species in a particular ecosystem. It is usually measured as the number of individuals found per sample. The ratio of abundance of one species to one or multiple other species living in an ecosystem is called relative species abundance. Both indicators are relevant for computing biodiversity.

There are many different biodiversity indexes. These investigate different scales and time spans. Biodiversity has various scales and subcategories (e.g. phylogenetic diversity, species diversity, genetic diversity, nucleotide diversity).

The question of net loss in confined regions is often a matter of debate.

== Observations by type of life ==
=== Wildlife in general ===
The World Wildlife Fund's Living Planet Report 2022 found that wildlife populations declined by an average 69% since 1970.

An October 2020 analysis by Swiss Re found that one-fifth of all countries are at risk of ecosystem collapse as the result of anthropogenic habitat destruction and increased wildlife loss. If these losses are not reversed, a total ecosystem collapse could ensue.

In 2022, the World Wildlife Fund reported an average population decline of 68% between 1970 and 2016 for 4,400 animal species worldwide, encompassing nearly 21,000 monitored populations.

=== Terrestrial invertebrates ===
==== Insects ====
An annual decline of 5.2% in flying insect biomass found in nature reserves in Germany – about 75% loss in 26 years

Insects are the most numerous and widespread class in the animal kingdom, accounting for up to 90% of all animal species. In the 2010s, reports emerged about the widespread decline in populations across multiple insect orders. Most commonly, the declines involve reductions in abundance, though in some cases entire species are going extinct, with estimates of the number of insect species at risk of extinction ranging between 10% and 40%. The reported severity shocked many observers, even though there had been earlier findings of pollinator decline. An anecdotal manifestation of the decline in insect abundance in the 20th and 21st century is the windscreen phenomenon.

Causes for the decline in insect population are similar to those driving other biodiversity loss. They include habitat destruction, such as intensive agriculture, the use of pesticides (particularly insecticides), introduced species, and the effects of climate change. An additional cause that may be specific to insects is light pollution.

==== Earthworms ====
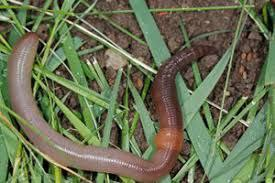
Earthworm on plant

Scientists have studied the loss of earthworms from several long-term agronomic trials. They found that relative biomass losses of minus 50–100% (with a mean of minus 83%) match or exceed those reported for other faunal groups. Thus it is clear that earthworms are similarly depleted in the soils of fields used for intensive agriculture. Earthworms play an important role in ecosystem function, helping with biological processing in soil, water, and even greenhouse gas balancing. There are five reasons for the decline of earthworm diversity: "(1) soil degradation and habitat loss, (2) climate change, (3) excessive nutrient and other forms of contamination load, (4) over-exploitation and unsustainable management of soil, and (5) invasive species". Factors like tillage practices and intensive land use deplete the soil and plant roots that earthworms use to create their biomass. This interferes with carbon and nitrogen cycles.

Knowledge of earthworm species diversity is quite limited as not even 50% of them have been described. Sustainable agriculture methods could help prevent earthworm diversity decline, for example reduced tillage. The Secretariat of the Convention on Biological Diversity is trying to take action and promote the restoration and maintenance of the many diverse species of earthworms.

=== Amphibians ===
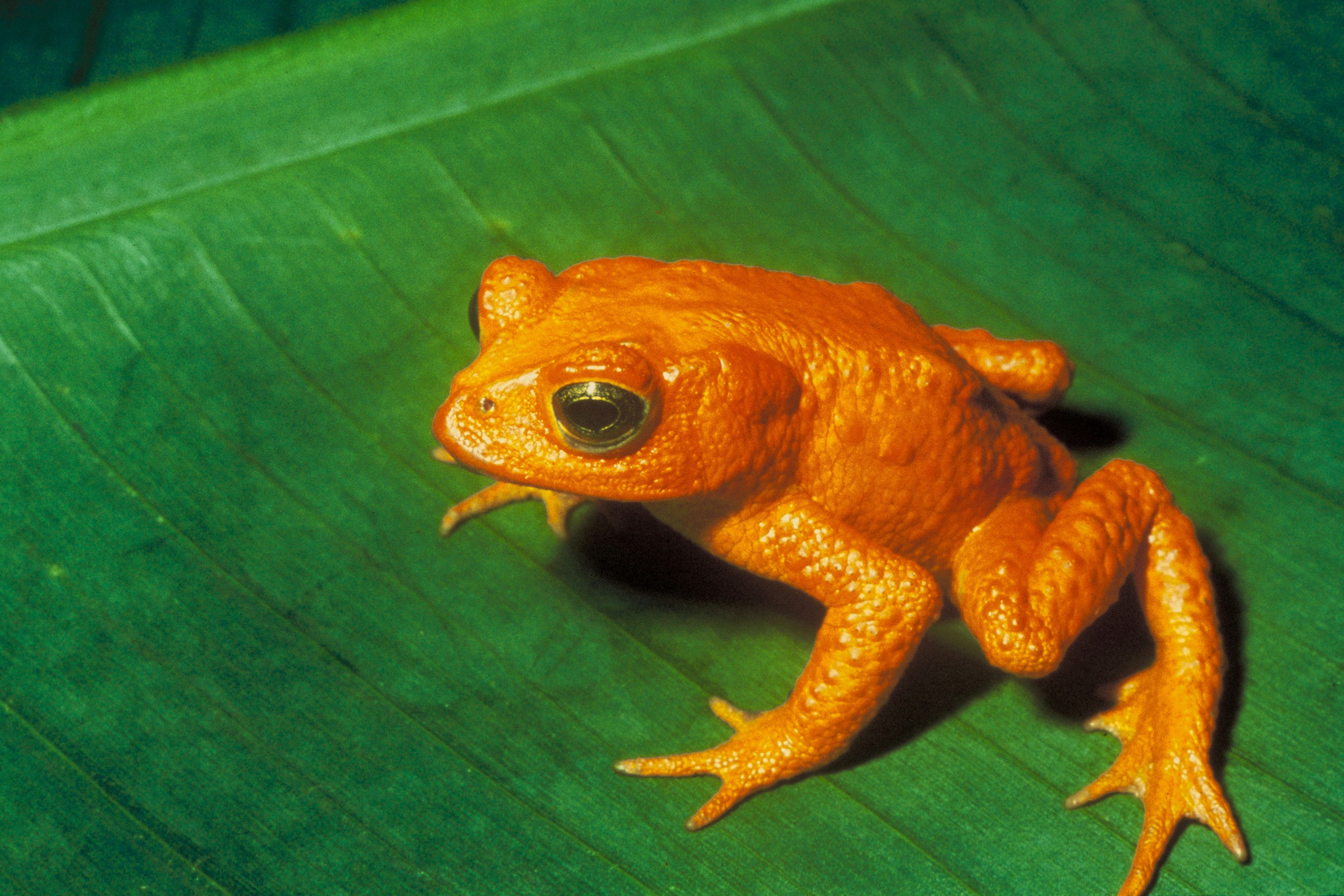
The golden toad of Monteverde, Costa Rica, was among the first casualties of amphibian declines. Formerly abundant, it was last seen in 1989.

Since the 1980s, decreases in amphibian populations, including population decline and localized mass extinctions, have been observed in locations all over the world. This type of biodiversity loss is known as one of the most critical threats to global biodiversity. The possible causes include habitat destruction and modification, diseases, exploitation, pollution, pesticide use, introduced species, and ultraviolet-B radiation (UV-B). However, many of the causes of amphibian declines are still poorly understood, and the topic is currently a subject of ongoing research.

Modeling results found that the current extinction rate of amphibians could be 211 times greater than the background extinction rate. This estimate even goes up to 25,000–45,000 times if endangered species are also included in the computation.

=== Wild mammals ===
Biomass of mammals on Earth as of 2018
1. Livestock, mostly cattle and pigs (60.0%)
2. Humans (36.0%)
3. Wild mammals (4.00%)

The decline of wild mammal populations globally has been an occurrence spanning over the past 50,000 years, at the same time as the populations of humans and livestock have increased. Nowadays, the total biomass of wild mammals on land is believed to be seven times lower than its prehistoric values, while the biomass of marine mammals had declined fivefold. At the same time, the biomass of humans is "an order of magnitude higher than that of all wild mammals", and the biomass of livestock mammals like pigs and cattle is even larger than that. Even as wild mammals had declined, the growth in the numbers of humans and livestock had increased total mammal biomass fourfold. Only 4% of that increased number are wild mammals, while livestock and humans amount to 60% and 36%. Alongside the simultaneous halving of plant biomass, these striking declines are considered part of the prehistoric phase of the Holocene extinction.

Since the second half of the 20th century, a range of protected areas and other wildlife conservation efforts (such as the Repopulation of wolves in Midwestern United States) have been implemented. These have had some impact on preserving wild mammal numbers. There is still some debate over the total extent of recent declines in wild mammals and other vertebrate species. In any case, many species are now in a worse state than decades ago. Hundreds of species are critically endangered. Climate change also has negative impacts on land mammal populations.

=== Birds ===
Some pesticides, like insecticides, likely play a role in reducing the populations of specific bird species. According to a study funded by BirdLife International, 51 bird species are critically endangered and eight could be classified as extinct or in danger of extinction. Nearly 30% of extinction is due to hunting and trapping for the exotic pet trade. Deforestation, caused by unsustainable logging and agriculture, could be the next extinction driver, because birds lose their habitat and their food.

=== Plants ===
==== Trees ====
While plants are essential for human survival, they have not received the same attention as the conservation of animals. It is estimated that a third of all land plant species are at risk of extinction and 94% have yet to be evaluated in terms of their conservation status. Plants existing at the lowest trophic level require increased conservation to reduce negative impacts at higher trophic levels.

In 2022, scientists warned that a third of tree species are threatened with extinction. This will significantly alter the world's ecosystems because their plant responses, carbon, water and nutrient cycles will be affected. Forest areas are degraded due to common factors such as logging, fire, and firewood harvesting. Especially with forest fires and its increases, it will affect biomass recovery and affect species composition as well. The Global Tree Assessment (GTA) has determined that "17,510 (29.9%) tree species are considered threatened with extinction. In addition, there are 142 tree species recorded as Extinct or Extinct in the Wild."

Possible solutions can be found in some silvicultural methods of forest management that promote tree biodiversity, such as selective logging, thinning or crop tree management, and clear cutting and coppicing. Without solutions, secondary forests recovery in species richness can take 50 years to recover the same amount as the primary forest, or 20 years to recover 80% of species richness.

==== Flowering plants ====
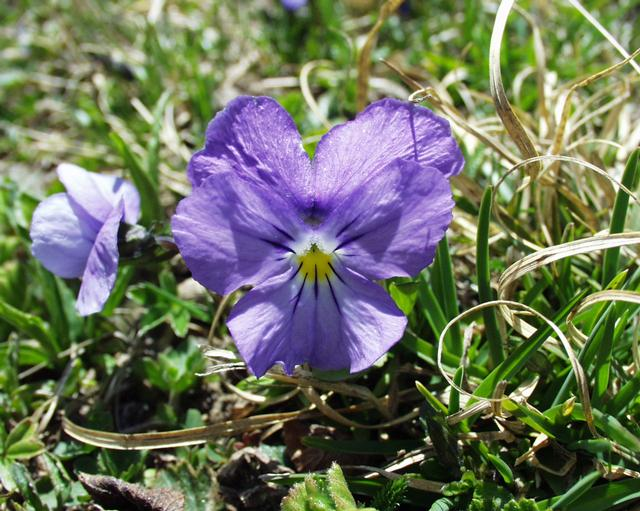
Viola calcarata, a species highly vulnerable to climate change.

Human impact on the environment has driven a range of species extinct and is threatening even more today. Multiple organizations such as IUCN and Royal Botanic Gardens, Kew suggest that around 40% of plant species are threatened with extinction. The majority are threatened by habitat loss, but activities such as logging of wild timber trees and collection of medicinal plants, or the introduction of non-native invasive species, also play a role.

Relatively few plant diversity assessments have considered climate change, yet it is starting to impact plants as well. About 3% of flowering plants are very likely to be driven extinct within a century at 2 °C (3.6 °F) of global warming, and 10% at 3.2 °C (5.8 °F). In worst-case scenarios, half of all tree species may be driven extinct by climate change over that timeframe.

=== Freshwater species ===
Freshwater ecosystems such as swamps, deltas, and rivers make up 1% of earth's surface. They are important because they are home to approximately one third of vertebrate species. Freshwater species are beginning to decline at twice the rate of species that live on land or in the ocean. This rapid loss has already placed 27% of 29,500 species dependent on fresh water on the IUCN Red List.

Global populations of freshwater fish are collapsing due to water pollution and overfishing. Migratory fish populations have declined by 76% since 1970, and large "megafish" populations have fallen by 94% with 16 species declared extinct in 2020.

=== Marine species ===
Marine biodiversity encompasses any living organism that resides in the ocean or in estuaries. By 2018, approximately 240,000 marine species had been documented. But many marine species—estimates range between 178,000 and 10 million oceanic species—remain to be described. It is therefore likely that a number of rare species (not seen for decades in the wild) have already disappeared or are on the brink of extinction, unnoticed.

Human activities have a strong and detrimental influence on marine biodiversity. The main drivers of marine species extinction are habitat loss, pollution, invasive species, and overexploitation. Greater pressure is placed on marine ecosystems near coastal areas because of the human settlements in those areas.

Overexploitation has resulted in the extinction of over 25 marine species. This includes seabirds, marine mammals, algae, and fish. Examples of extinct marine species include Steller's sea cow (Hydrodamalis gigas) and the Caribbean monk seal (Monachus tropicalis). Not all extinctions are because of humans. For example, in the 1930s, the eelgrass limpet (Lottia alveus) became extinct in the Atlantic once the Zostera marina seagrass population declined upon exposure to a disease. The Lottia alveus were greatly impacted because the Zostera marina were their sole habitats.

== Causes ==
The main causes of current biodiversity loss are:

1. Habitat loss, fragmentation and degradation; for example habitat fragmentation for commercial and agricultural uses (specifically monoculture farming)
2. Land use intensification (and ensuing land loss/habitat loss); a significant factor in loss of ecological services due to direct effects as well as biodiversity loss
3. Nutrient pollution and other forms of pollution (air and water pollution)
4. Overexploitation and unsustainable use (for example unsustainable fishing methods, overfishing, overconsumption and human overpopulation)
5. Invasive species that effectively compete for a niche, replacing indigenous species
6. Climate change (e.g. extinction risk from climate change, effects of climate change on plant biodiversity)

Jared Diamond describes an "Evil Quartet" of habitat destruction, overkill, introduced species and secondary extinctions. Edward O. Wilson suggested the acronym HIPPO for the main causes of biodiversity loss: Habitat destruction, Invasive species, Pollution, human over-Population and Over-harvesting.

=== Habitat destruction ===
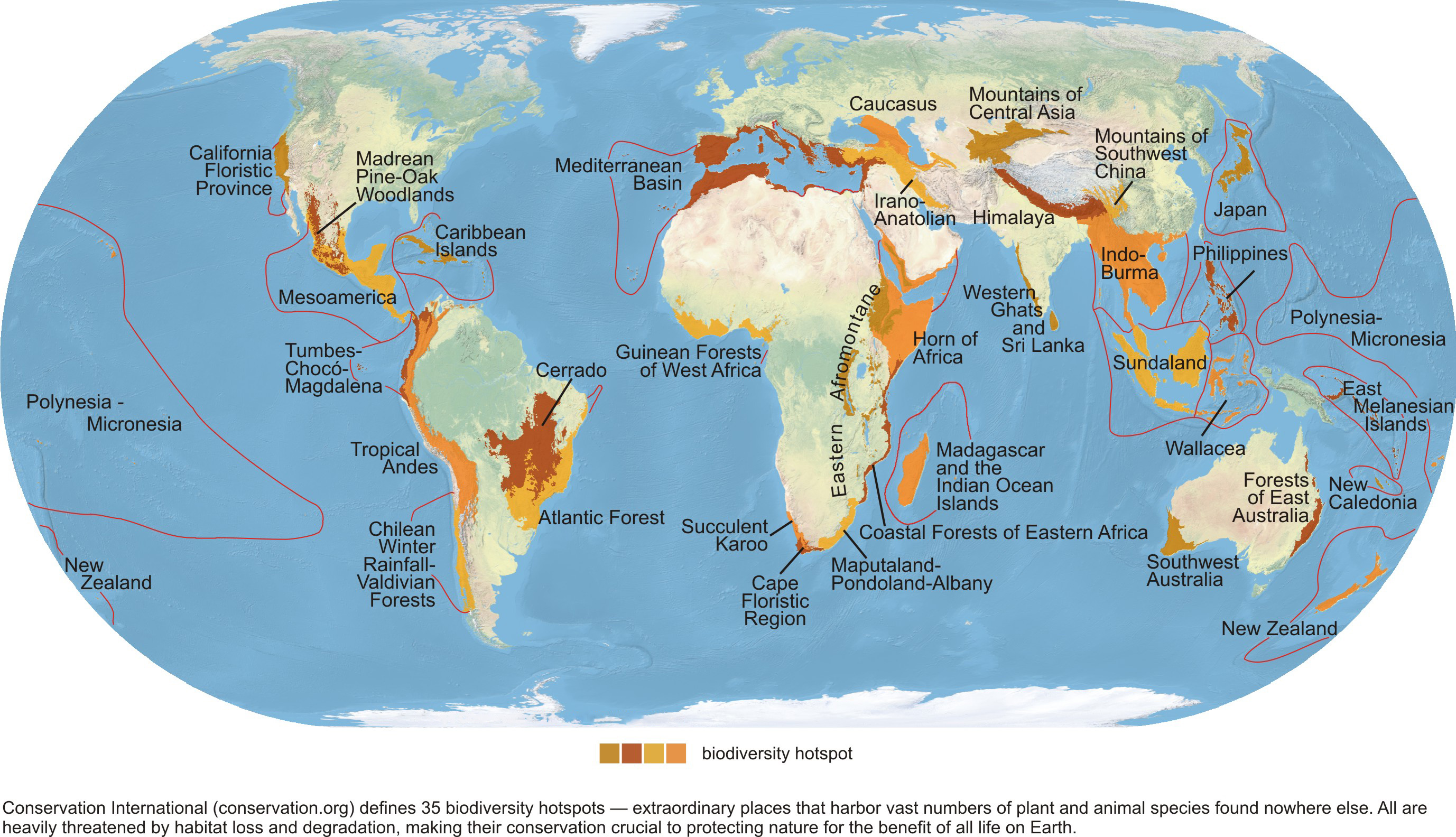
Earth's 25 terrestrial hot spots of biodiversity. These regions contain a high number of plant and animal species and have been subjected to high levels of habitat destruction by human activity, leading to biodiversity loss.

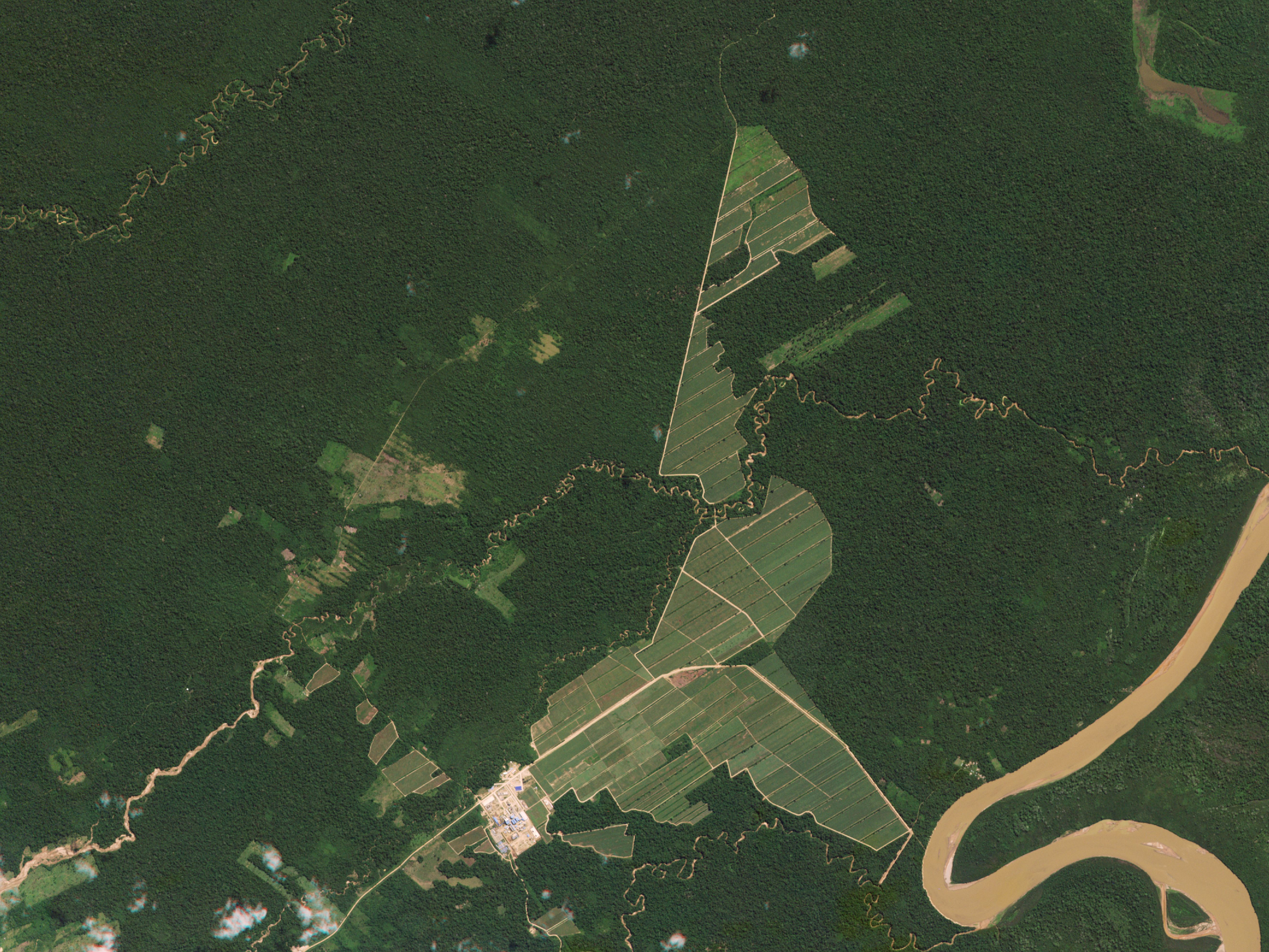
Deforestation and increased road-building in the Amazon rainforest in Bolivia cause significant concern because of increased human encroachment upon wild areas, increased resource extraction and further threats to biodiversity.

Habitat destruction (also termed habitat loss) occurs when a natural habitat is no longer able to support its native species. The organisms once living there have either moved elsewhere, or are dead, leading to a decrease in biodiversity and species numbers. Habitat destruction is in fact the leading cause of biodiversity loss and species extinction worldwide.

Humans contribute to habitat destruction through the use of natural resources, agriculture, industrial production and urbanization (urban sprawl). Other activities include mining, logging, and trawling. Environmental factors can contribute to habitat destruction more indirectly. Geological processes, climate change, introduction of invasive species, ecosystem nutrient depletion, water and noise pollution are some of the examples. Loss of habitat can be preceded by an initial habitat fragmentation. Fragmentation and loss of habitat have become one of the most important topics of research in ecology as they are major threats to the survival of endangered species.

For example, habitat loss is one of the causes in the decline of insect populations (see the section below on insects).

==== Urban growth and habitat fragmentation ====
The direct effects of urban growth on habitat loss are well understood: building construction often results in habitat destruction and fragmentation. This leads to selection for species that are adapted to urban environments. Small habitat patches cannot support the level of genetic or taxonomic diversity they formerly could while some more sensitive species may become locally extinct. Species abundance populations are reduced due to the reduced fragmented area of habitat. This causes an increase of species isolation and forces species toward edge habitats and to adapt to foraging elsewhere. Additionally, edge effects often result in altered light, temperature, and humidity conditions that change vegetation structure and microhabitat suitability, further reducing biodiversity in fragmented urban patches. Urban environments also favor fast-reproducing, mobile species, contributing to biotic homogenization and the global decline of ecological uniqueness.

Infrastructure development in Key Biodiversity Areas (KBA) is a major driver of biodiversity loss, with infrastructure present in roughly 80% of KBAs. Infrastructure development leads to conversion and fragmentation of natural habitat, pollution and disturbance. There can also be direct harm to animals through collisions with vehicles and structures. This can have impacts beyond the infrastructure site. For example, chronic noise from roads can interfere with bird song used in mating and territory defense, reducing reproductive success. Artificial lighting can disrupt nocturnal foraging patterns, predator-prey interactions, and migratory navigation in species such as bats, amphibians, and sea turtles. Infrastructure can also create ecological traps, where animals are drawn to altered environments that ultimately reduce their fitness or survival. Furthermore, road mortality and bird collisions with buildings and power lines cause direct harm to wildlife, with cascading impacts across trophic levels. These impacts often extend well beyond the development footprint and may disrupt landscape connectivity critical for migration and climate adaptation. Fragmented landscapes also impede species' range shifts in response to climate change, making it harder for populations to track suitable environmental conditions and increasing extinction risk.

=== Land use intensification ===
Humans are changing the uses of land in various ways, and each can lead to habitat destruction and biodiversity loss. The 2019 Global Assessment Report on Biodiversity and Ecosystem Services found that industrial agriculture is the primary driver of biodiversity collapse. The UN's Global Biodiversity Outlook 2014 estimated that 70% of the projected loss of terrestrial biodiversity is caused by agriculture use.This is supported by more recent findings from the 2022 Global Land Outlook report by the UN Convention to Combat Desertification, which states that over 50% of agricultural land is moderately or severely degraded. According to a 2005 publication, "Cultivated systems [...] cover 24% of Earth's surface". The publication defined cultivated areas as "areas in which at least 30% of the landscape is in croplands, shifting cultivation, confined livestock production, or freshwater aquaculture in any particular year".As of 2023, approximately 38% of the Earth's terrestrial surface is used for agriculture, including grazing and crop production, making it the dominant land use globally.

More than 17,000 species are at risk of losing habitat by 2050 as agriculture continues to expand to meet future food needs (as of 2020). A global shift toward largely plant-based diets would free up land to allow for the restoration of ecosystems and biodiversity. In the 2010s over 80% of all global farmland was used to rear animals. Recent FAO data shows that livestock systems occupy about 77% of agricultural land while providing less than 20% of the global calorie supply — highlighting an imbalance between land use and nutritional output.

As of 2022, 44% of Earth's land area required conservation attention, which may include declaring protected areas and following land-use policies. Additionally, a 2023 analysis in Science Advances concluded that at least 30% of land must be actively protected and ecologically restored by 2030 to meet global biodiversity goals, aligning with the Kunming-Montreal Global Biodiversity Framework agreed upon at COP15.

=== Nutrient pollution and other forms of pollution ===
==== Air pollution ====
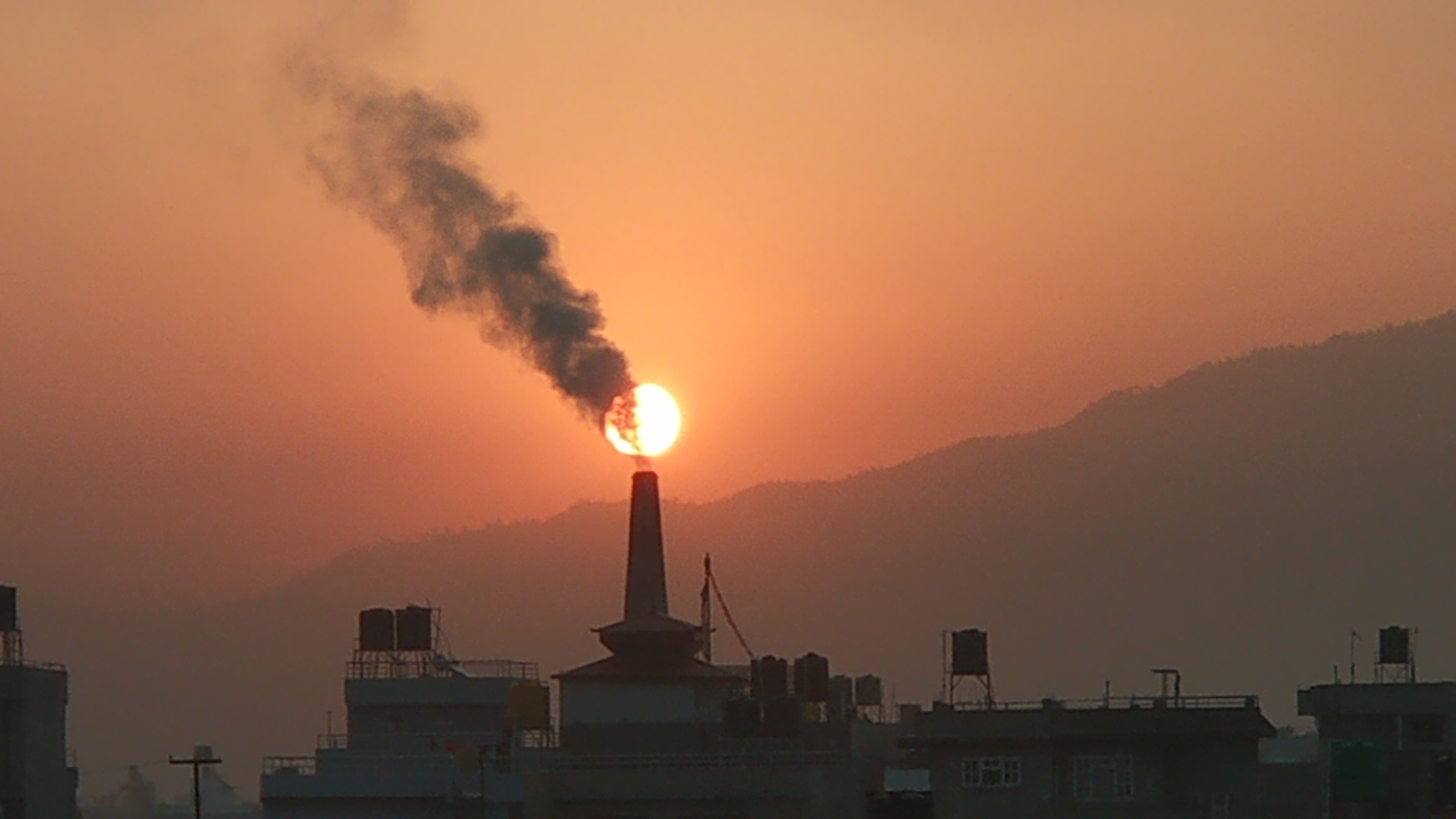
Industrial processes contributing to air pollution through the emission of carbon dioxide, sulfur dioxide, and nitrous oxide.

Air pollution adversely affects biodiversity. Pollutants are emitted into the atmosphere by the burning of fossil fuels and biomass, for example. Industrial and agricultural activity releases the pollutants sulfur dioxide and nitrogen oxides. Once sulfur dioxide and nitrogen oxide are introduced into the atmosphere, they can react with cloud droplets (cloud condensation nuclei), raindrops, or snowflakes, forming sulfuric acid and nitric acid. With the interaction between water droplets and sulfuric and nitric acids, wet deposition occurs and creates acid rain.

A 2009 review studied four air pollutants (sulfur, nitrogen, ozone, and mercury) and several types of ecosystems. Air pollution affects the functioning and biodiversity of terrestrial as well as aquatic ecosystems. For example, "air pollution causes or contributes to acidification of lakes, eutrophication of estuaries and coastal waters, and mercury bioaccumulation in aquatic food webs".

==== Noise pollution ====
Noise generated by traffic, ships, vehicles, and aircraft can affect the survivability of wildlife species and can reach undisturbed habitats. Noise pollution is common in marine ecosystems, affecting at least 55 marine species. One study found that as seismic noises and naval sonar increases in marine ecosystems, cetacean diversity decreases (including whales and dolphins). Multiple studies have found that fewer fishes, such as cod, haddock, rockfish, herring, sand seal, and blue whiting, have been spotted in areas with seismic noises, with catch rates declining by 40–80%.

Noise pollution has also altered avian communities and diversity. Noise can reduce reproductive success, minimize nesting areas, increase stress response, and reduce species abundance. Noise pollution can alter the distribution and abundance of prey species, which can then impact predator populations.

==== Pollution from fossil fuel extraction ====
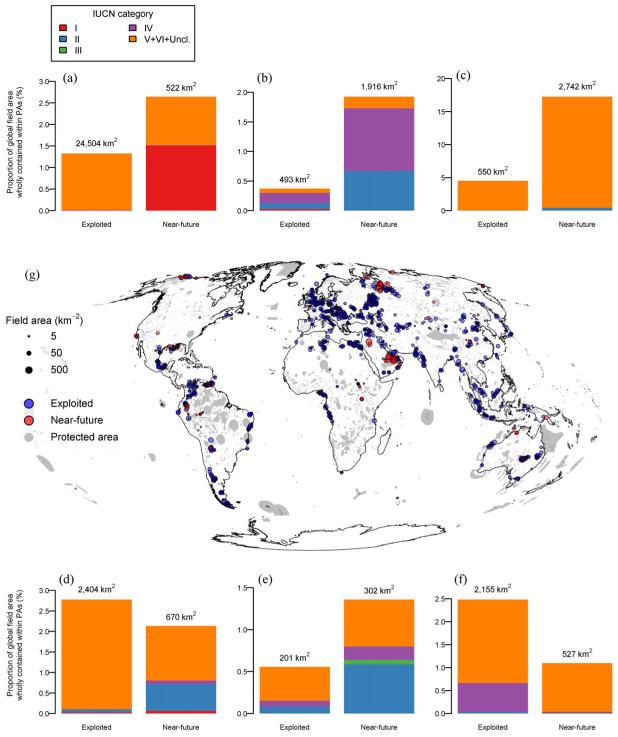
Potential for biodiversity loss from future fossil fuel extraction: Proportions of oil and gas field area overlapping with Protected Areas (PAs) (gray polygons) of different IUCN Protected Area management categories by UN regions: North America (a), Europe (b), West Asia (c), LAC (d), Africa (e), and Asia Pacific (f). Absolute area of overlap across all IUCN management categories is shown above histograms. Location of fields overlapping with PAs are shown in (g). Shading is used so that points can be visualized even where their spatial locations coincide, so darker points indicate higher densities of fields overlapping PAs.

Fossil fuel extraction and associated oil and gas pipelines have major impacts on the biodiversity of many biomes due to land conversion, habitat loss and degradation, and pollution. An example is the Western Amazon region. Exploitation of fossil fuels there has had significant impacts on biodiversity. As of 2018, many of the protected areas with rich biodiversity were in areas containing unexploited fossil fuel reserves worth between $3 and $15 trillion. The protected areas may be under threat in future.

=== Overexploitation ===
Continued overexploitation can lead to the destruction of the resource, as it will be unable to replenish. The term applies to natural resources such as water aquifers, grazing pastures and forests, wild medicinal plants, fish stocks and other wildlife.

==== Overfishing ====
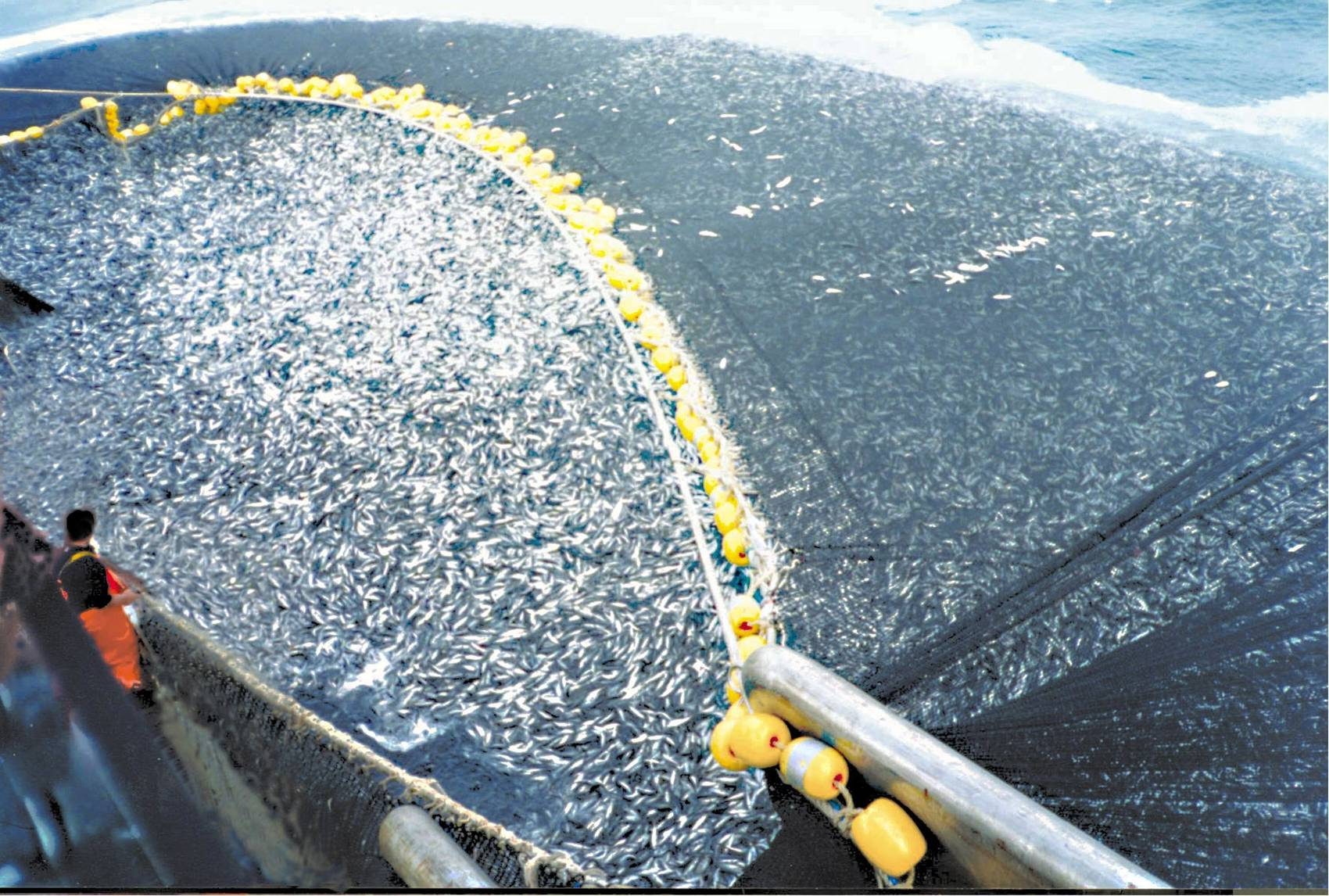
Mass fishing of Pacific jack mackerel (with possible bycatch) with a Chilean purse seiner.

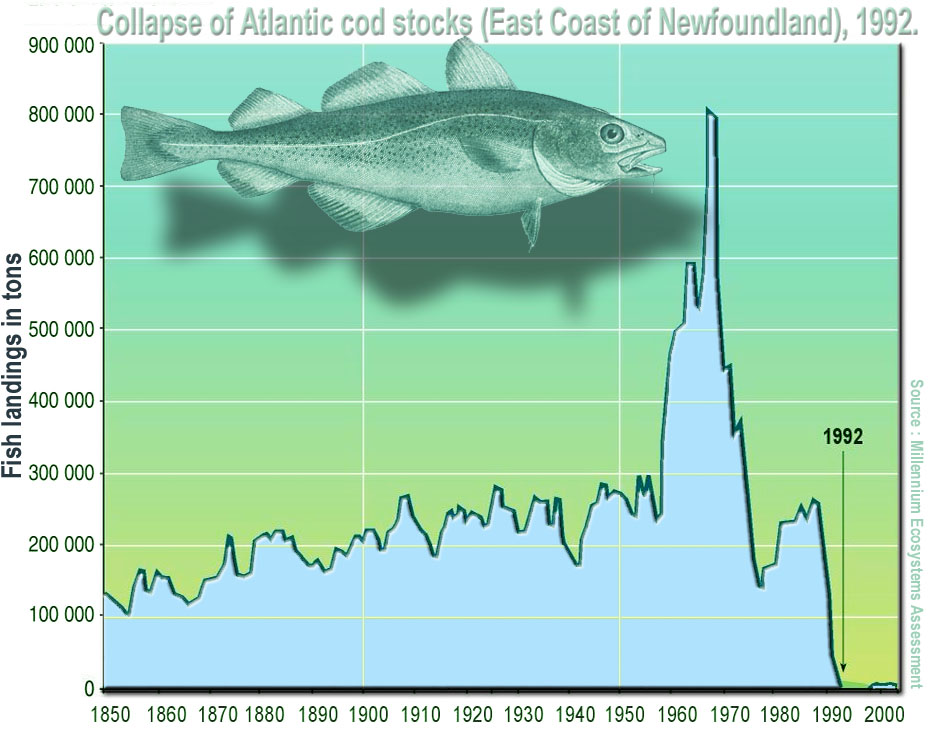
Atlantic cod stocks were severely overexploited in the 1970s and 1980s, leading to their abrupt collapse in 1992.

A 2019 Intergovernmental Science-Policy Platform on Biodiversity and Ecosystem Services report found that overfishing is the main driver of mass species extinction in oceans. Overfishing has reduced fish and marine mammal biomass by 60% since the 1800s. It is currently pushing over one-third of sharks and rays toward extinction.

Many commercial fishes have been overharvested: a 2020 FAO report classified as overfished 34% of the fish stocks of the world's marine fisheries. By 2020, global fish populations had declined 38% since 1970.

Many regulatory measures are available for controlling overfishing. These include fishing quotas, bag limits, licensing, closed seasons, size limits, and the creation of marine reserves and other marine protected areas.

==== Human overpopulation and overconsumption ====
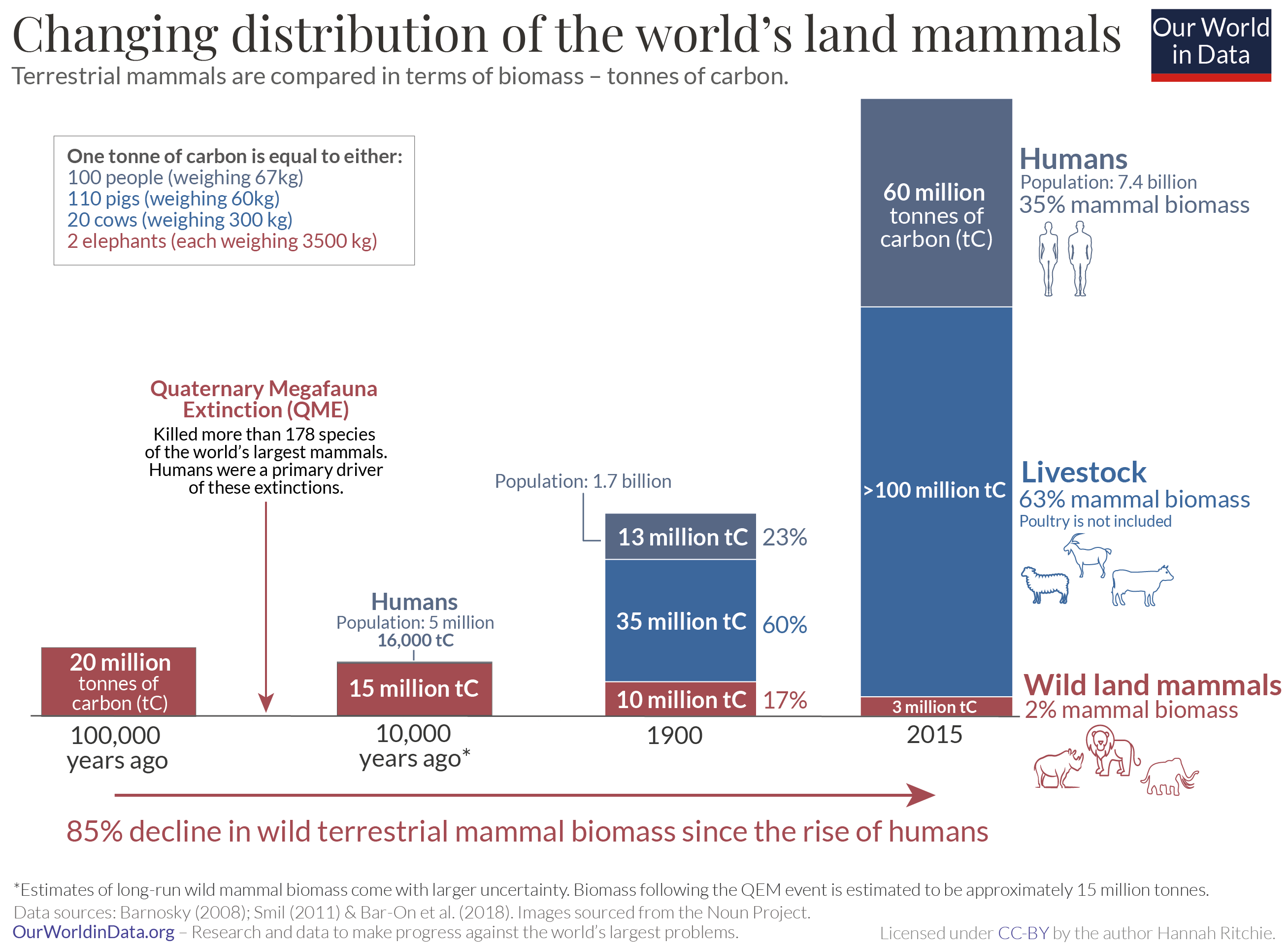
The changing distribution of the world's land mammals in tonnes of carbon. The biomass of wild land mammals has declined by 85% since the emergence of humans.

The world's population numbered nearly 7.6 billion as of mid-2017 and is forecast to peak toward the end of the 21st century at 10–12 billion people. Scholars have argued that population size and growth, along with overconsumption, are significant factors in biodiversity loss and soil degradation. Review articles, including the 2019 IPBES report, have also noted that human population growth and overconsumption are significant drivers of species decline. A 2022 study warned that conservation efforts will continue to fail if the primary drivers of biodiversity loss continue to be ignored, including population size and growth. A 2026 study published in Sustainable Development argued that gradually reducing the human population to 4 billion by 2200 is a path towards sustainability which will help decrease overconsumption, biodiversity loss and greenhouse gas emissions.

Other scientists have criticized the assertion that population growth is a key driver for biodiversity loss. They argue that the main driver is the loss of habitat, caused by "the growth of commodities for export, particularly soybean and oil-palm, primarily for livestock feed or biofuel consumption in higher income economies." Because of the wealth disparities between countries, there is a negative correlation between a country's total population and its per capita footprint. On the other hand, the correlation between a country's GDP and its footprint is strong. The study argues that population as a metric is unhelpful and counterproductive for tackling environmental challenges.

=== Invasive species ===
The term invasive is poorly defined and often subjective. The European Union defines invasive alien species as those outside their natural distribution area that threaten biological diversity. Biotic invasion is considered one of the five top drivers of global biodiversity loss and is increasing because of tourism and globalization. This may be particularly true in poorly regulated fresh water systems, though quarantines and ballast water rules have improved the situation.

Invasive species may drive local native species to extinction via competitive exclusion, niche displacement, or hybridisation with related native species. Therefore, alien invasions may result in extensive changes in the structure, composition and global distribution of the biota at sites of introduction. This leads to the homogenisation of the world's fauna and flora and biodiversity loss.

=== Climate change ===
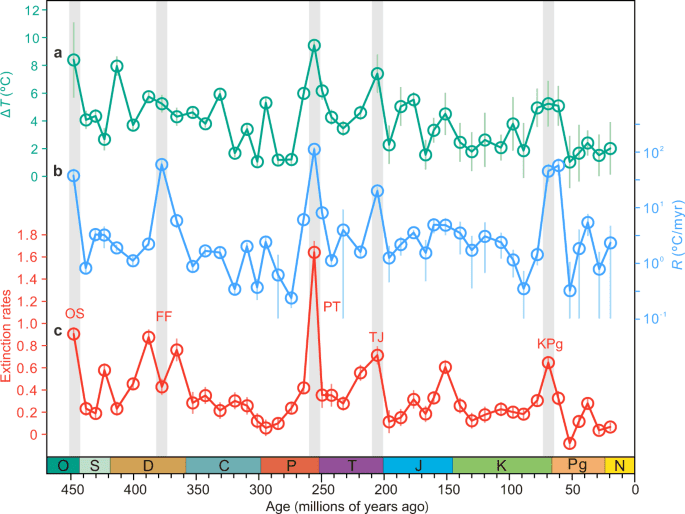
The relationship between the magnitude of climate variability and change (including both large increases and decreases in global temperature) and the extinction rate, over the past 450 million years. This graph does not include the recent human made climate change.

Climate change is another threat to global biodiversity. It has changed rapidly due to human activities, such as burning fossil fuels and release of methane gas and pollution. Recent studies have found that global surface temperatures are expected to increase due to atmospheric carbon dioxide levels. But habitat destruction, e.g., for the expansion of agriculture, is currently a more significant driver of biodiversity loss.

A 2021 collaborative report by scientists from the IPBES and the IPCC found that biodiversity loss and climate change must be addressed simultaneously, as they are inextricably linked and have similar effects on human well-being. In 2022, Frans Timmermans, Vice-President of the European Commission, said that people are less aware of the threat of biodiversity loss than they are of the threat of climate change.

The interaction between climate change and invasive species is complex and not easy to assess. Climate change is likely to favour some invasive species and harm others, but few authors have identified specific consequences of climate change for invasive species.

Invasive species and other disturbances have become more common in forests in the last several decades. These tend to be directly or indirectly connected to climate change and have negative consequences for forest ecosystems.

Decline in arctic sea ice extent (area) from 1979 to 2022

Decline in arctic sea ice volume from 1979 to 2022

Climate change contributes to destruction of some habitats, endangering various species. For example:

- Climate change causes rising sea levels which will threaten natural habitats and species globally.
- Melting sea ice destroys habitat for some species. For example, the decline of sea ice in the Arctic has been accelerating during the early twenty‐first century, with a decline rate of 4.7% per decade (it has declined over 50% since the first satellite records). One well known example of a species affected is the polar bear, whose habitat in the Arctic is threatened. Algae can also be affected when it grows on the underside of sea ice.
- Warm-water coral reefs are very sensitive to global warming and ocean acidification. Coral reefs provide a habitat for thousands of species. They provide ecosystem services such as coastal protection and food. But 70–90% of today's warm-water coral reefs will disappear even if warming is kept to 1.5 °C (2.7 °F). For example, Caribbean coral reefs – which are biodiversity hotspots – will be lost within the century if global warming continues at the current rate.

==== Extinction risks ====
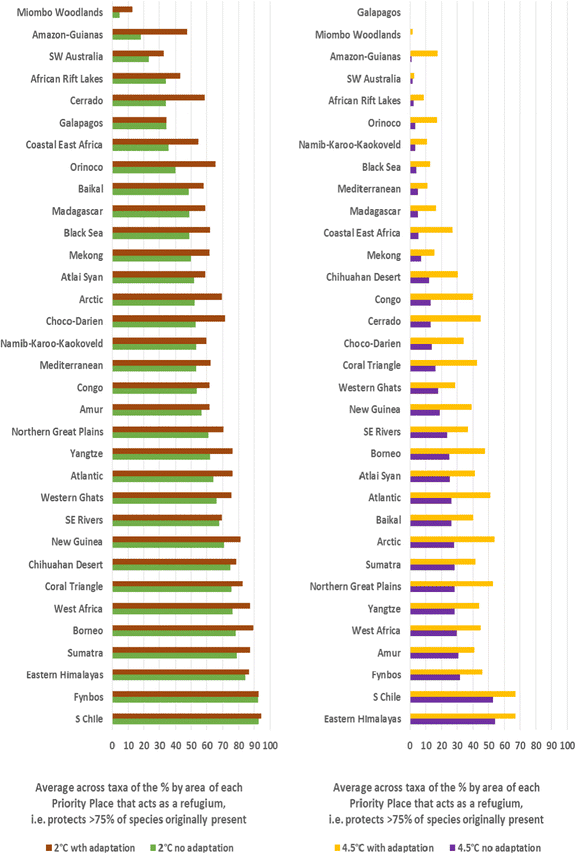
Relative to now, key areas for wildlife will retain less of their biodiversity under 2 °C (3.6 °F) of global warming, and even less under 4.5 °C (8.1 °F).

There are several plausible pathways that could lead to plant and animal species extinction from climate change. Every species has evolved to exist within a certain ecological niche, but climate change leads to changes of temperature and average weather patterns. These changes can push climatic conditions outside of the species' niche, and ultimately render it extinct. Normally, species faced with changing conditions can either adapt in place through microevolution or move to another habitat with suitable conditions. However, the speed of recent climate change is very fast. Due to this rapid change, for example cold-blooded animals (a category which includes amphibians, reptiles and all invertebrates) may struggle to find a suitable habitat within 50 km of their current location at the end of this century (for a mid-range scenario of future global warming).

Climate change also increases both the frequency and intensity of extreme weather events, which can directly wipe out regional populations of species. Those species occupying coastal and low-lying island habitats can also become extinct by sea level rise. This has already happened with Bramble Cay melomys in Australia, which was the first mammal to go extinct due to human-induced sea level rise, with the Australian government officially confirming its extinction in 2019.

== Impacts ==
=== On ecosystems ===
Biodiversity loss has bad effects on the functioning of ecosystems. This in turn affects humans, because affected ecosystems can no longer provide the same quality of ecosystem services, such as crop pollination, cleaning air and water, decomposing waste, and providing forest products as well as areas for recreation and tourism.

Two key statements of a 2012 comprehensive review of the previous 20 years of research include:

- "There is now unequivocal evidence that biodiversity loss reduces the efficiency by which ecological communities capture biologically essential resources, produce biomass, decompose and recycle biologically essential nutrients"; and
- "Impacts of diversity loss on ecological processes might be sufficiently large to rival the impacts of many other global drivers of environmental change"

Permanent global species loss (extinction) is a more dramatic phenomenon than regional changes in species composition. But even minor changes from a healthy stable state can have a dramatic influence on the food web and the food chain, because reductions in one species can adversely affect the entire chain (coextinction). This can lead to an overall reduction in biodiversity, unless alternative stable states of the ecosystem are possible.

For example, a study on grasslands used manipulated grassland plant diversity and found that ecosystems with higher biodiversity show more resistance of their productivity to climate extremes.

=== On food and agriculture ===
An infographic describing the relationship between biodiversity and food.

In 2019, the UN's Food and Agriculture Organization (FAO) produced its first report on The State of the World's Biodiversity for Food and Agriculture. It warned that "Many key components of biodiversity for food and agriculture at genetic, species and ecosystem levels are in decline."

The report also said, "Many of the drivers that have negative impacts on BFA (biodiversity for food and agriculture), including overexploitation, overharvesting, pollution, overuse of external inputs, and changes in land and water management, are at least partially caused by inappropriate agricultural practices" and "transition to intensive production of a reduced number of species, breeds and varieties, remain major drivers of loss of BFA and ecosystem services."

To reduce biodiversity loss related to agricultural practices, FAO encourages the use of "biodiversity-friendly management practices in crop and livestock production, forestry, fisheries and aquaculture".

=== On health and medicines ===
The WHO has analyzed how biodiversity and human health are connected: "Biodiversity and human health, and the respective policies and activities, are interlinked in various ways. First, biodiversity gives rise to health benefits. For example, the variety of species and genotypes provide nutrients and medicines." The ongoing drivers and effects of biodiversity loss has the potential to lead to future zoonotic disease outbreaks like the COVID-19 pandemic.

Medicinal and aromatic plants are widely used in traditional medicine as well as in cosmetic and food industries. The WHO estimated in 2015 that about "60,000 species are used for their medicinal, nutritional and aromatic properties". There is a global trade in plants for medicinal purposes.

Biodiversity contributes to the development of pharmaceuticals. A significant proportion of medicines are derived from natural products, either directly or indirectly. Many of these natural products come from marine ecosystems. However, unregulated and inappropriate over-harvesting (bioprospecting) could potentially lead to overexploitation, ecosystem degradation and loss of biodiversity. Users and traders harvest plants for traditional medicine either by planting them or by collecting them in the wild. In both cases, sustainable medicinal resource management is important.

== Proposed solutions ==
Red List Index (2019): The Red List Index (RLI) defines the conservation status of major species groups, and measures trends in the proportion of species expected to remain extant in the near future without additional conservation action. An RLI value of 1.0 equates to all species being categorised as 'Least Concern', and hence that none are expected to go extinct in the near future. A value of 0 indicates that all species have gone extinct.

Scientists are investigating what can be done to address biodiversity loss and climate change together. For both of these crises, there is a need to "conserve enough nature and in the right places". A 2020 study found that "beyond the 15% land area currently protected, 35% of land area is needed to conserve additional sites of particular importance for biodiversity and stabilize the climate."

Additional measures for protecting biodiversity, beyond just environmental protection, are important. Such measures include addressing drivers of land use change, increasing efficiency in agriculture, and reducing the need for animal agriculture. The latter could be achieved by increasing the shares of plant-based diets.

=== Convention on Biological Diversity ===
Many governments have conserved portions of their territories under the Convention on Biological Diversity (CBD), a multilateral treaty signed in 1992–3. The 20 Aichi Biodiversity Targets are part of the CBD's Strategic Plan 2011–2020 and were published in 2010. Aichi Target Number 11 aimed to protect 17% of terrestrial and inland water areas and 10% of coastal and marine areas by 2020 .

Of the 20 biodiversity goals laid out by the Aichi Biodiversity Targets in 2010, only six were partially achieved by 2020. The 2020 CBD report highlighted that if the status quo does not change, biodiversity will continue to decline due to "currently unsustainable patterns of production and consumption, population growth and technological developments". The report also singled out Australia, Brazil, Cameroon and the Galapagos Islands (Ecuador) for having had one of its animals lost to extinction in the previous ten years.

Following this, the leaders of 64 nations and the European Union pledged to halt environmental degradation and restore the natural world. The pledge was not signed by leaders from some of the world's biggest polluters, namely China, India, Russia, Brazil and the United States. Some experts contend that the United States' refusal to ratify the Convention on Biological Diversity is harming global efforts to halt the extinction crisis.

Scientists say that even if the targets for 2020 had been met, no substantial reduction of extinction rates would likely have resulted. Others have raised concerns that the Convention on Biological Diversity does not go far enough, and argue the goal should be zero extinctions by 2050, along with cutting the impact of unsustainable food production on nature by half. That the targets are not legally binding has also been subject to criticism.

In December 2022, every country except the United States and the Holy See signed onto the Kunming-Montreal Global Biodiversity Framework at the 2022 United Nations Biodiversity Conference.This framework calls for protecting 30% of land and oceans by 2030 (30 by 30). It also has 22 other targets intended to reduce biodiversity loss. At the time of signing the agreement, only 17% of land territory and 10% of ocean territory were protected. The agreement includes protecting the rights of Indigenous peoples and changing the current subsidy policy to one better for biodiversity protection, but it takes a step backward in protecting species from extinction in comparison to the Aichi Targets. Critics said the agreement does not go far enough to protect biodiversity, and that the process was rushed.

=== Other international and national action ===
In 2019 the Intergovernmental Science-Policy Platform on Biodiversity and Ecosystem Services (IPBES) published the Global Assessment Report on Biodiversity and Ecosystem Services. This report said that up to a million plant and animal species are facing extinction because of human activity. The IPBES is an international organization that has a similar role to the Intergovernmental Panel on Climate Change (IPCC), except that it focuses on biodiversity and ecosystem services, not climate change.

The United Nations' Sustainable Development Goal 15 (SDG 15), "Life on Land", includes biodiversity targets. Its fifth target is: "Take urgent and significant action to reduce the degradation of natural habitats, halt the loss of biodiversity and, by 2020, protect and prevent the extinction of threatened species." This target has one indicator: the Red List Index.

Nearly three-quarters of bird species, two thirds of mammals and more than half of hard corals have been recorded at World Heritage Sites, even though they cover less than 1% of the planet. Countries with World Heritage Sites can include them in their national biodiversity strategies and action plans.

== See also ==
- Biodiversity offsetting
- Defaunation
- Depauperate ecosystem
- Ecological collapse
- Ecological extinction
- Effects of climate change on biomes
- Effects of climate change on plant biodiversity
- Species reintroduction
- Triple planetary crisis
