= Effects of climate change on plant biodiversity =

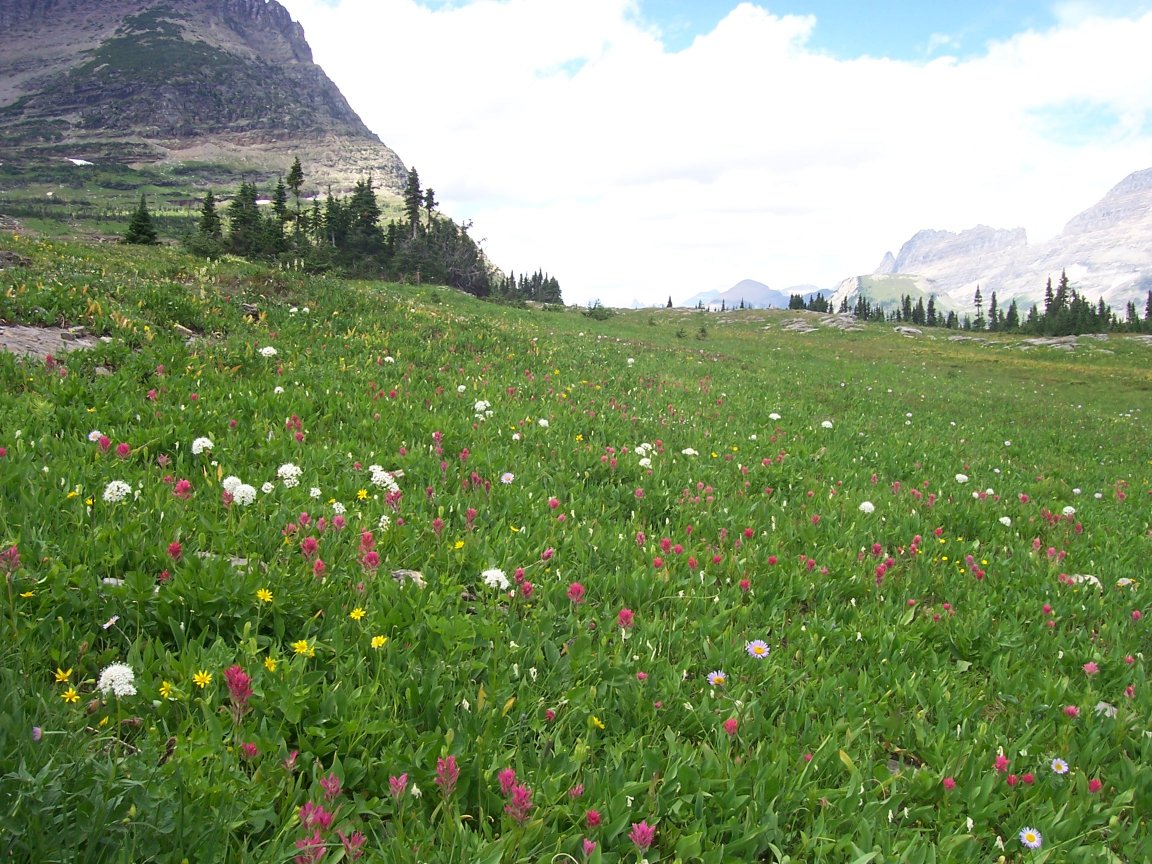
Alpine plants are one group expected to be highly susceptible to the impacts of climate change (Logan Pass, in Montana, United States).

There is an ongoing decline in plant biodiversity, just like there is ongoing biodiversity loss for many other life forms. One of the causes for this decline is climate change. Environmental conditions play a key role in defining the function and geographic distributions of plants. A 2016 survey of 976 plant & animal species found that climate-related local extinctions had already occurred in 47% of species examined, with 39% of plant species affected. Therefore, when environmental conditions change, this can result in changes to biodiversity. The effects of climate change on plant biodiversity can be predicted by using various models, for example bioclimatic models.

Habitats may change due to climate change. This can cause non-native plants and pests to impact native vegetation diversity. Therefore, the native vegetation may become more vulnerable to damage.

Another example are wildfires: if they become more intense due to climate change, this may result in more severe burn conditions and shorter burn intervals. This can threaten the biodiversity of native vegetation.

== Direct impacts ==
Changing climatic variables relevant to the function and distribution of plants include increasing CO_{2} concentrations (see CO_{2} fertilization effect), increasing global temperatures, altered precipitation patterns, and changes in the pattern of extreme weather events such as cyclones, fires or storms.

Because individual plants and therefore species can only function physiologically, and successfully complete their life cycles under specific environmental conditions (ideally within a subset of these), changes to climate are likely to have significant impacts on plants from the level of the individual right through to the level of the ecosystem or biome.

=== Effects of temperature ===
One common hypothesis among scientists is that the warmer an area is, the higher the plant diversity. This hypothesis can be observed in nature, where higher plant biodiversity is often located at certain latitudes (which often correlates with a specific climate/temperature). Plant species in montane and snowy ecosystems are at greater risk for habitat loss due to climate change. The effects of climate change are predicted to be more severe in mountains of northern latitude. Heat and drought as a result of climate change has been found to severely impact tree mortality rates, putting forest ecosystems at high risk. Globally speaking, one-third of the world's land area is forested. Forests play an important role in combating climate change because they absorb significant volumes of carbon dioxide. They account for 80-90% of all plant biomass on Earth, giving them a tremendous natural capacity to store carbon. Forests are critical in order to adapt and mitigate the effects of climate change, without them our planet would most likely become warmer and drier faster.

=== Changes in distributions ===
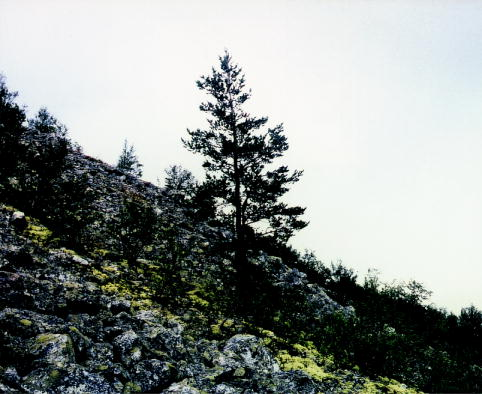
Pine tree representing an elevational tree-limit rise of 105 m over the period 1915–1974. Nipfjället, Sweden

If climatic factors such as temperature and precipitation change in a region beyond the tolerance of a species phenotypic plasticity, then distribution changes of the species may be inevitable. There is already evidence that plant species are shifting their ranges in altitude and latitude as a response to changing regional climates. Yet it is difficult to predict how species ranges will change in response to climate and separate these changes from all the other man-made environmental changes such as eutrophication, acid rain and habitat destruction.

When compared to the reported past migration rates of plant species, the rapid pace of current change has the potential to not only alter species distributions, but also render many species as unable to follow the climate to which they are adapted. The environmental conditions required by some species, such as those in alpine regions may disappear altogether. The result of these changes is likely to be a rapid increase in extinction risk, and regional decreases in species richness. Adaptation to new conditions may also be of great importance in the response of plants.

Predicting the extinction risk of plant species is not easy however. Estimations from particular periods of rapid climatic change in the past have shown relatively little species extinction in some regions, for example. Knowledge of how species may adapt or persist in the face of rapid change is still relatively limited.

It is clear now that the loss of some species will be very dangerous for humans because they will stop providing services. Some of them have unique characteristics that cannot be replaced by any other.

Distributions of species and plant species will narrow following the effects of climate change. Climate change can affect areas such as wintering and breeding grounds to birds. Migratory birds use wintering and breeding grounds as a place to feed and recharge after migrating for long hours. If these areas are damaged due to climate change, it will eventually affect them as well.

Lowland forest have gotten smaller during the last glacial period and those small areas became island which are made up of drought resisting plants. In those small refugee areas there are also a lot of shade dependent plants. As an example, the dynamics of the calcareous grassland were significantly impacted due to the climate factors.

Changes in the suitability of a habitat for a species drive distributional changes by not only changing the area that a species can physiologically tolerate, but how effectively it can compete with other plants within this area. Changes in community composition are therefore also an expected product of climate change. Overall, losses in plant community diversity caused by global warming are expected to exceed gains, especially in water-limited ecosystems where intensifying drought pushes species beyond their physiological tolerances.

=== Changes in life-cycles ===
Plants typically reside in locations that are beneficial to their life histories. The timing of phenological events such as flowering and leaf production, are often related to environmental variables, including temperature, which can be altered by climate change. Changing environments are, therefore, expected to lead to changes in life cycle events, and these have been recorded for many species of plants, therefore, many plant species are considered to be adequate indicators of climate change. These changes have the potential to lead to the asynchrony between species, or to change competition between plants. Both the insect pollinators and plant populations will eventually become extinct due to the uneven and confusing connection that is caused by the change of climate. Flowering times in British plants for example have changed, leading to annual plants flowering earlier than perennials, and insect pollinated plants flowering earlier than wind pollinated plants; with potential ecological consequences. Other observed effects also include the lengthening in growing seasons of certain agricultural crops such as wheat and maize. A recently published study has used data recorded by the writer and naturalist Henry David Thoreau to confirm effects of climate change on the phenology of some species in the area of Concord, Massachusetts. Another life-cycle change is a warmer winter which can lead to summer rainfall or summer drought.

Ultimately, climate change can affect the phenology and interactions of many plant species, and depending on its effect, can make it difficult for a plant to be productive.

== Indirect impacts ==
All species are likely to be directly impacted by the changes in environmental conditions discussed above, and also indirectly through their interactions with other species. While direct impacts may be easier to predict and conceptualise, it is likely that indirect impacts are equally important in determining the response of plants to climate change. A species whose distribution changes as a direct result of climate change may invade the range of another species or be invaded, for example, introducing a new competitive relationship or altering other processes such as carbon sequestration.

The range of a symbiotic fungi associated with plant roots (i.e., mycorrhizae) may directly change as a result of altered climate, resulting in a change in the plant's distribution.

The ongoing decline of animal populations has reduced the capacity of plants across the globe to disperse their seeds by an estimated 60%, severely limiting their ability to shift ranges in response to climate change.

Long-term monitoring data indicate that local plant diversity has declined by approximately 4% per decade in areas with little change in precipitation, while increasing by approximately 11% per decade where precipitation change has been observed to be greater.

Climate change can interact with ozone pollution, as ozone pollution makes plants lose more water through transpiration.

== Extinction risks ==
Data from 2018 found that at 1.5 °C (2.7 °F), 2 °C (3.6 °F) and 3.2 °C (5.8 °F) of global warming, over half of climatically determined geographic range would be lost by 8%, 16%, and 44% of plant species. This corresponds to more than 20% likelihood of extinction over the next 10–100 years under the IUCN criteria.

The 2022 IPCC Sixth Assessment Report estimates that while at 2 °C (3.6 °F) of global warming, fewer than 3% of flowering plants would be at a very high risk of extinction, this increases to 10% at 3.2 °C (5.8 °F).

A 2020 meta-analysis found that while 39% of vascular plant species were likely threatened with extinction, only 4.1% of this figure could be attributed to climate change, with land use change activities predominating. However, the researchers suggested that this may be more representative of the slower pace of research on effects of climate change on plants. For fungi, it estimated that 9.4% are threatened due to climate change, while 62% are threatened by other forms of habitat loss.

2024 review paper projected likely extinctions of 8% to 16% plant species as well as 8%–27% fungi species under RCP4.5 by 2070. Under RCP8.5 23% to 31% of both plant and fungi species would be lost.

== Challenges of modeling future impacts ==
Predicting the effects that climate change will have on plant biodiversity can be achieved using various models, however bioclimatic models are most commonly used.

Improvement of models is an active area of research, with new models attempting to take factors such as life-history traits of species or processes such as migration into account when predicting distribution changes; though possible trade-offs between regional accuracy and generality are recognised.

Climate change is also predicted to interact with other drivers of biodiversity change such as habitat destruction and fragmentation, or the introduction of foreign species. These threats may possibly act in synergy to increase extinction risk from that seen in periods of rapid climate change in the past.

== See also ==
- CO_{2} fertilization effect
- Decline in insect populations
- Effects of climate change on biomes
- Mycorrhizae and changing climate
