= Nonequilibrium theory =

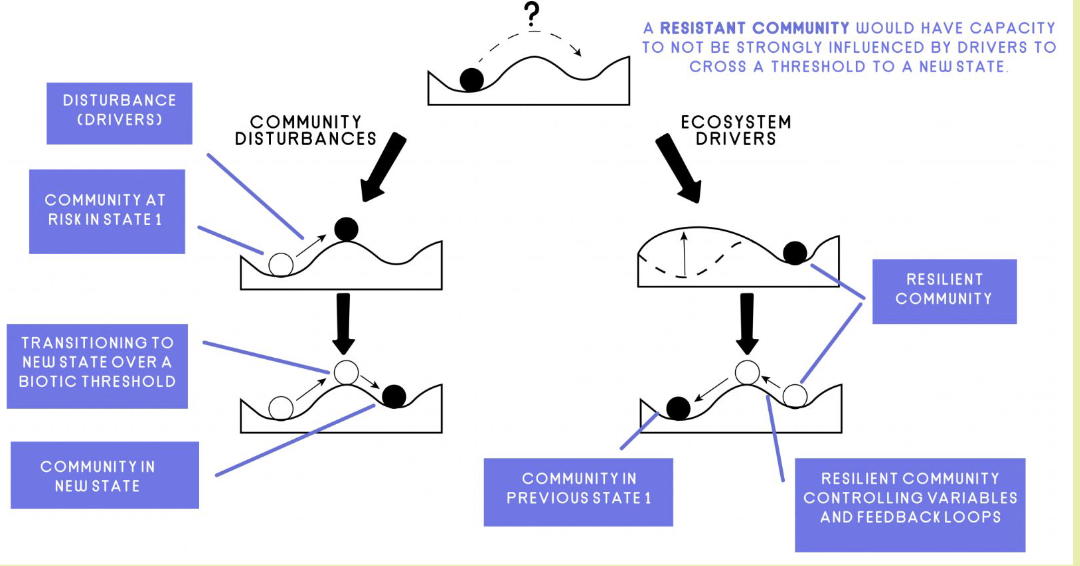
Schematic demonstrating nonequilibrium theory in terms of community disturbances and ecosystem drivers.

Nonequilibrium theory refers to the idea that ecosystems are not in a stable state, but instead are fluctuating from disturbances and pressures. Disturbances like disease, predators, climate change, fires, and others lead to shifts in ecosystem characteristics and prevent the return to equilibrium. Once shifted to an altered state, it can be difficult to return to an original state.

This theory challenges traditional ideas of stability. Ecosystems are dynamic, ever changing structures that can be influenced by numerous characteristics.This perspective has important implications for conservation, prompting a shift toward strategies that embrace change, resilience, and adaptability rather than trying to preserve a single state.

== Disturbance driven dynamics ==
Ecosystems are frequently influenced by a large variety of different disturbances. These disturbances can be periodic, unpredictable, with very different intensities. Disturbances may arise from natural events or human activities, each having the potential to drastically alter ecosystem structure and function.

=== Natural disturbance ===
- Wildfire
- Hurricanes
- Tornadoes
- Floods and droughts
- Extreme temperature fluctuations

=== Human disturbance ===
- Land use change (urbanization, crop land, deforestation)
- Pollution
- Invasive species introduction
- Overexploitation of resources

== Multiple stable states ==
Depending on external pressures, ecosystems can exist under alternate stable states. Even under equal environment conditions multiple states can exist (hysteresis). For example, overfishing in coral reef ecosystems can reduce herbivorous fish populations, allowing algae to overgrow and dominate the system. Even if fishing pressure is later reduced, the system may remain in this algae-dominated state unless active restoration occurs. Another possibility is a system depending on certain conditions meaning that even under identical conditions it may never revert to its previous condition. For example in rangelands, vegetation can shift from perennial grasses to shrub-dominated systems under persistent disturbance. These altered states may not recover even when conditions are reversed, showing different thresholds and hysteresis in terrestrial systems.

== Historical perspectives ==
Historically, most ecological models were based on equilibrium theory, which thought ecosystems would self regulate, and eventually would return to a balanced state following disturbance. In the 1970's and 1980's evidence of ecosystems under disturbance, competition, and inconsistencies in natural resource management outcomes would often prevent this. This shift was further supported by rangeland studies, which challenged classical succession-based ideas and promoted the use of state-and-transition models to describe the nonlinear, dynamic change of nature. Persistent disturbances, species competition, and inconsistencies in natural resource management outcomes often prevented the re-establishment of a single equilibrium point. Not being able to reach a single stable equilibrium lead to new ideas about a non-equilibrium theory.

== Resilience theory ==
The concept of resilience acknowledges ecosystems can show wide fluctuations under disturbance but still be resilient. Instead of stability ecosystems are able to resist and transform under certain conditions.

- Engineering resilience: The ability of an ecosystem to return to a single stable state after a disturbance.
- Ecological resilience: The ability of an ecosystem to handle disturbances while maintaining the essential functions and structures
- Adaptive resilience: The ability of an ecosystem to evolve and adapt to new conditions or disturbances rather to returning to a previous state.

These different modes of resilience can be found in certain ecosystems, capable of with standing certain disturbances.

== Conservation use ==
Conservation strategies can benefit from nonequilibrium. Instead of managing for the idea of stability, managers can plan for resilience to better withstand disturbances. Preventing tipping points can be a useful target strategy. Being open to an idea of ecosystem change over time allows for thought of protecting species and habitats over a continuous period. What this means is the use of adaptive management, will allow for strategies that are flexible and responsive when needed.

=== Adaptive management ===
This style of management is all about dynamic methods that embraces uncertainty and change. Instead of fixed solutions, it promotes using management actions as a tool to observe what is working vs what isn't working. Through long-term monitoring, continuous adjustment, and feedback, managers are able to improve ecological outcomes over time while avoiding these tipping point and critical states.

== See also ==
- Adaptive management
- Ecological resilience
- Disturbance (ecology)
- Ecological succession
- Rangeland management
