= Millennium Ecosystem Assessment =

Environmental impact assessment

The Millennium Ecosystem Assessment (MA) is a major assessment of the human impact on the environment, called for by the United Nations Secretary-General Kofi Annan in 2000, launched in 2001 and published in 2005 with more than $14 million of grants. It popularized the term ecosystem services, the benefits gained by humans from ecosystems.

== History ==
During the 1990s, international conventions such as the UNEP Convention on Biological Diversity and the Convention to Combat Desertification identified the need for a global scientific ecosystem assessment. There had been advances in resource economics with little effect on environmental policy. In November 1998, UNEP, NASA, and the World Bank published a study called "Protecting our Planet, Securing our Future: Linkages Among Global Environmental Issues and Human Needs". In 2001, the Millennium Ecosystem Assessment was launched with work over a period of four years. Over 1300 contributors from 95 countries were involved as authors.

== Funding ==
In May 2000 the Global Environment Facility approved a $7 million grant, followed in July 2000 by a United Nations Foundation $4 million grant and financial support from the government of Norway for the first meeting of the Board of the MA in Trondheim, and in December 2000 a $2.4 million grant by the Packard Foundation for a total of more than $13.4 million, considered "75% of the full budget".

== Findings ==
The MA was published in 2005 and made four main assessments:

- Over the past 50 years, humans have changed ecosystems more rapidly and extensively than in any comparable period of time in human history, largely to meet rapidly growing demands for food, fresh water, timber, fiber and fuel. This has resulted in a substantial and largely irreversible loss in the diversity of life on Earth.
- The changes to ecosystems have contributed to substantial net gains in human well-being and economic development, but these gains have been achieved at growing costs in the form of the degradation of many ecosystem services, increased risks of nonlinear changes, and the exacerbation of poverty for some groups of people. These problems, unless addressed, will substantially diminish the benefits that future generations obtain from ecosystems.
- The degradation of ecosystem services could grow significantly worse during the first half of this century and is a barrier to achieving the Millennium Development Goals.
- The challenge of reversing the degradation of ecosystem while meeting increasing demands for services can be partially met under some scenarios considered by the MA, but will involve significant changes in policies, institutions and practices that are not currently under way. Many options exist to conserve or enhance specific ecosystem services in ways that reduce negative trade-offs or that provide positive synergies with other ecosystem services.

The bottom line of the MA findings has been that human actions are depleting Earth’s natural capital, putting such strain on the environment that the ability of the planet’s ecosystems to sustain future generations can no longer be taken for granted. At the same time, the assessment shows that with appropriate actions it is possible to reverse the degradation of many ecosystem services over the next 50 years, but the changes in policy and practice required are substantial and not currently underway.

== Legacy ==
In 2008, a report calculated that the world's richest countries caused environmental damage to developing nations at more than the entire developing world debt of $1.8 trillion.

== See also ==
- Environmental issue
- Conservation (ethic)
- Sustainability
- The Economics of Ecosystems and Biodiversity
- Special Report on Climate Change and Land
- Global Assessment Report on Biodiversity and Ecosystem Services
- The Limits to Growth, a 1972 book about the computer modeling of exponential economic and population growth with finite resource supplies
