= Effects of climate change on biomes =

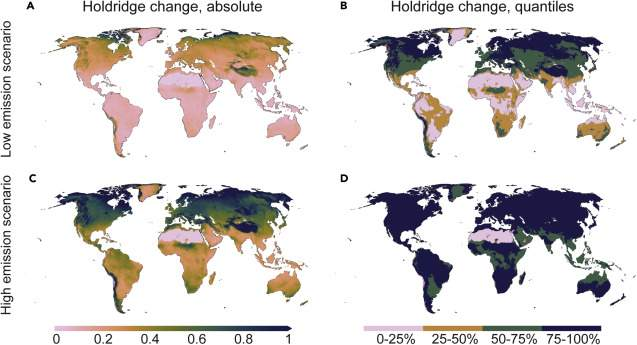
Predicted changes for Earth's biomes under two different climate change scenarios for 2081–2100. Top row is low emissions scenario, bottom row is high emissions scenario. Biomes are classified with Holdridge life zones system. A shift of 1 or 100% (darker colours) indicates that the region has fully moved into a completely different biome zone type.

Climate change is already now altering biomes, adversely affecting terrestrial and marine ecosystems. Climate change represents long-term changes in temperature and average weather patterns. This leads to a substantial increase in both the frequency and the intensity of extreme weather events. As a region's climate changes, a change in its flora and fauna follows. For instance, out of 4000 species analyzed by the IPCC Sixth Assessment Report, half were found to have shifted their distribution to higher latitudes or elevations in response to climate change.

Furthermore, climate change may cause ecological disruption among interacting species, via changes in behaviour and phenology, or via climate niche mismatch. For example, climate change can cause species to move in different directions, potentially disrupting their interactions with each other.

Examples of effects on some biome types are provided in the following. Research into desertification is complex, and there is no single metric which can define all aspects. However, more intense climate change is still expected to increase the current extent of drylands on the Earth's continents. Most of the expansion will be seen over regions such as "southwest North America, the northern fringe of Africa, southern Africa, and Australia".

Mountains cover approximately 25 percent of the Earth's surface and provide a home to more than one-tenth of the global human population. Changes in global climate pose a number of potential risks to mountain habitats.

Boreal forests, also known as taiga, are warming at a faster rate than the global average, leading to drier conditions in the Taiga, which leads to a whole host of subsequent impacts. Climate change has a direct impact on the productivity of the boreal forest, as well as its health and regeneration.

Almost no other ecosystem is as vulnerable to climate change as coral reefs. Updated 2022 estimates show that even at a global average increase of 1.5 °C (2.7 °F) over pre-industrial temperatures, only 0.2% of the world's coral reefs would still be able to withstand marine heatwaves, as opposed to 84% being able to do so now, with the figure dropping to 0% at 2 °C (3.6 °F) warming and beyond.

== Terminology and classification ==
On Earth, biomes are the main constituent parts of the biosphere, defined by a distinctive biological community and a shared regional climate. A single biome would include multiple ecosystems and ecoregions. According to the World Wildlife Fund classification, terrestrial, marine and freshwater environments each consist of hundreds of ecoregions, around a dozen biome types, and a single-digit number of biogeographic regions.

== General impacts ==
The 2007 IPCC Fourth Assessment Report concluded that over the last three decades human-induced warming had likely had an influence on many biological systems. The Sixth Assessment Report found that half of all species with long-term data had shifted their ranges poleward (or upward for mountain species). Two-thirds have had their spring events occur earlier. Several European bird species' breeding seasons have been shifted to earlier periods, as indicated by the shifts in nestling ringing dates. The range of hundreds of North American birds has shifted northward at an average rate of 1.5 km/year over the past 55 years.

Furthermore, climate change may disrupt the ecology among interacting species, via changes on behaviour and phenology, or via climate niche mismatch. The disruption of species-species associations is a potential consequence of climate-driven movements of each individual species in opposite directions. These changes further complicate natural resource management, with shifting species distributions and ecosystem dynamics increasing the uncertainty of long-term planning. Consequently, management strategies must become more flexible and adaptive to address continuous environmental changes. Climate change may, thus, lead to another extinction, more silent and mostly overlooked: the extinction of species' interactions. As a consequence of the spatial decoupling of species-species associations, ecosystem services derived from biotic interactions are also at risk from climate niche mismatch.

Whole ecosystem disruptions will occur earlier under more intense climate change: under the high-emissions RCP8.5 scenario, ecosystems in the tropical oceans would be the first to experience abrupt disruption before 2030, with tropical forests and polar environments following by 2050. In total, 15% of ecological assemblages would have over 20% of their species abruptly disrupted if as warming eventually reaches 4 °C (7.2 °F); in contrast, this would happen to fewer than 2% if the warming were to stay below 2 °C (3.6 °F).

== Terrestrial biomes ==
=== Deserts and drylands ===
Research into desertification is complex, and there is no single metric which can define all aspects. However, more intense climate change is still expected to increase the current extent of drylands on the Earth's continents: from 38% in late 20th century to 50% or 56% by the end of the 21st century, under the "moderate" and high-warming Representative Concentration Pathways 4.5 and 8.5. Most of the expansion will be seen over regions such as "southwest North America, the northern fringe of Africa, southern Africa, and Australia".

Climate change affects many factors associated with droughts. These include how much rain falls and how fast the rain evaporates again. Warming over land increases the severity and frequency of droughts around much of the world. In some tropical and subtropical regions of the world, there will probably be less rain due to global warming. This will make them more prone to drought. Droughts are set to worsen in many regions of the world. These include Central America, the Amazon and south-western South America. They also include West and Southern Africa. The Mediterranean and south-western Australia are also some of these regions.

Higher temperatures increase evaporation. This dries the soil and increases plant stress. Agriculture suffers as a result. This means even regions where overall rainfall is expected to remain relatively stable will experience these impacts. These regions include central and northern Europe. Without climate change mitigation, around one third of land areas are likely to experience moderate or more severe drought by 2100. Due to global warming droughts are more frequent and intense than in the past.

=== Grasslands ===
Grasslands often occur in areas with annual precipitation is between 600 mm (24 in) and 1,500 mm (59 in) and average mean annual temperatures ranges from −5 and 20 °C. However, some grasslands occur in colder (−20 °C) and hotter (30 °C) climatic conditions. Grassland can exist in habitats that are frequently disturbed by grazing or fire, as such disturbance prevents the encroachment of woody species. Species richness is particularly high in grasslands of low soil fertility such as serpentine barrens and calcareous grasslands, where woody encroachment is prevented as low nutrient levels in the soil may inhibit the growth of forest and shrub species. Another common predicament often experienced by the ill-fated grassland creatures is the constant burning of plants, fueled by oxygen and many expired photosynthesizing organisms, with the lack of rain pushing this problem to further heights. When not limited by other factors, increasing CO_{2} concentration in the air increases plant growth, similarly as water use efficiency, which is very important in drier regions. However, the advantages of elevated CO_{2} are limited by factors including water availability and available nutrients, particularly nitrogen. Thus effects of elevated CO_{2} on plant growth will vary with local climate patterns, species adaptations to water limitations, and nitrogen availability. Studies indicate that nutrient depletion may happen faster in drier regions, and with factors like plant community composition and grazing. Nitrogen deposition from air pollutants and increased mineralization from higher temperatures can increase plant productivity, but increases are often among a discount in biodiversity as faster-growing plants outcompete others. A study of a California grassland found that global change may speed reductions in diversity and forb species are most prone to this process.

=== Tundra ===
Many of the species at risk are Arctic and Antarctic fauna such as polar bears Climate change is also leading to a mismatch between the snow camouflage of arctic animals such as snowshoe hares with the increasingly snow-free landscape.

The Arctic was historically described as warming twice as fast as the global average, but this estimate was based on older observations which missed the more recent acceleration. By 2021, enough data was available to show that the Arctic had warmed three times as fast as the globe - 3.1°C between 1971 and 2019, as opposed to the global warming of 1°C over the same period. Moreover, this estimate defines the Arctic as everything above 60th parallel north, or a full third of the Northern Hemisphere: in 2021–2022, it was found that since 1979, the warming within the Arctic Circle itself (above the 66th parallel) has been nearly four times faster than the global average. Within the Arctic Circle itself, even greater Arctic amplification occurs in the Barents Sea area, with hotspots around West Spitsbergen Current: weather stations located on its path record decadal warming up to seven times faster than the global average. This has fuelled concerns that unlike the rest of the Arctic sea ice, ice cover in the Barents Sea may permanently disappear even around 1.5 degrees of global warming.

=== Mountains ===
Mountains cover approximately 25 percent of earth's surface and provide a home to more than one-tenth of global human population. Changes in global climate pose a number of potential risks to mountain habitats. Climate change can adversely affect both alpine tundra and montane grasslands and shrublands. It increases the number of extreme events such as the frequency and intensity of forest fires, and accelerates snowmelt, which makes more water available earlier in the year and reduces availability later in the year, while the reduction in snow cover insulation can paradoxically increase cold damage from springtime frost events. It also causes remarkable changes in phenology.

Studies suggest a warmer climate would cause lower-elevation habitats to expand into the higher alpine zone. Such a shift would encroach on rare alpine meadows and other high-altitude habitats. High-elevation plants and animals have limited space available for new habitat as they move higher on the mountains in order to adapt to long-term changes in regional climate. Such uphill shifts of both ranges and abundances have been recorded for various groups of species across the world. In some mountain areas, such as the Himalayas, climate change appears to promote the appearance of various invasive species of shrubs, eventually converting them to shrublands. Changes in precipitation appear to be the most important driver.

It's been estimated that by 2050, climate change alone could reduce species richness of trees in the Amazon rainforest by 31–37%, while deforestation alone could be responsible for 19–36%, and the combined effect might reach 58%. The paper's worst-case scenario for both stressors had only 53% of the original rainforest area surviving as a continuous ecosystem by 2050, with the rest reduced to a severely fragmented block. Another study estimated that the rainforest would lose 69% of its plant species under the warming of 4.5 °C (8.1 °F).

=== Boreal forests ===
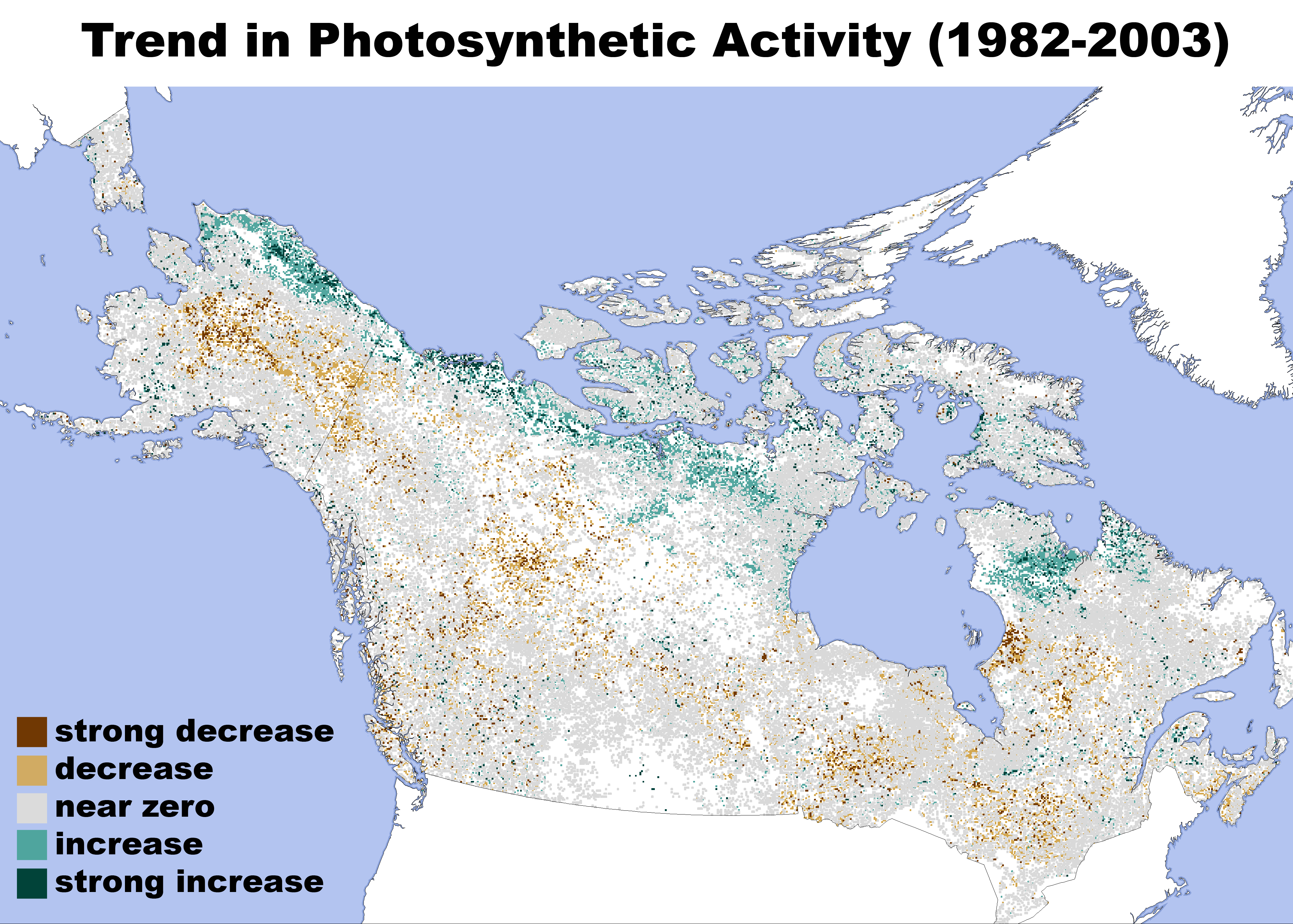
Change in Photosynthetic Activity in Northern Forests 1982–2003; NASA Earth Observatory

Boreal forests, also known as taiga, are warming at a faster rate than the global average. leading to drier conditions in the Taiga, which leads to a whole host of subsequent issues. Climate change has a direct impact on the productivity of the boreal forest, as well as health and regeneration. As a result of the rapidly changing climate, trees show declines in growth at the southern limit of their range, and are migrating to higher latitudes and altitudes (northward) to remain their climatic habitat, but some species may not be migrating fast enough. The number of days with extremely cold temperatures (e.g., −20 to −40 °C (−4 to −40 °F) has decreased irregularly but systematically in nearly all the boreal region, allowing better survival for tree-damaging insects. The 10-year average of boreal forest burned in North America, after several decades of around 10,000 km^{2} (2.5 million acres), has increased steadily since 1970 to more than 28,000 km^{2} (7 million acres) annually., and records in Canada show increases in wildfire from 1920 to 1999.

Early 2010s research confirmed that since the 1960s, western Canadian boreal forests, and particularly the western coniferous forests, had already suffered substantial tree losses due to drought, and some conifers were getting replaced with aspen. Similarly, the already dry forest areas in central Alaska and far eastern Russia are also experiencing greater drought, placing birch trees under particular stress, while Siberia's needle-shedding larches are replaced with evergreen conifers - a change which also affects the area's albedo (evergreen trees absorb more heat than the snow-covered ground) and acts as a small, yet detectable climate change feedback. At the same time, eastern Canadian forests have been much less affected; yet some research suggests it would also reach a tipping point around 2080, under the RCP 8.5 scenario which represents the largest potential increase in anthropogenic emissions.

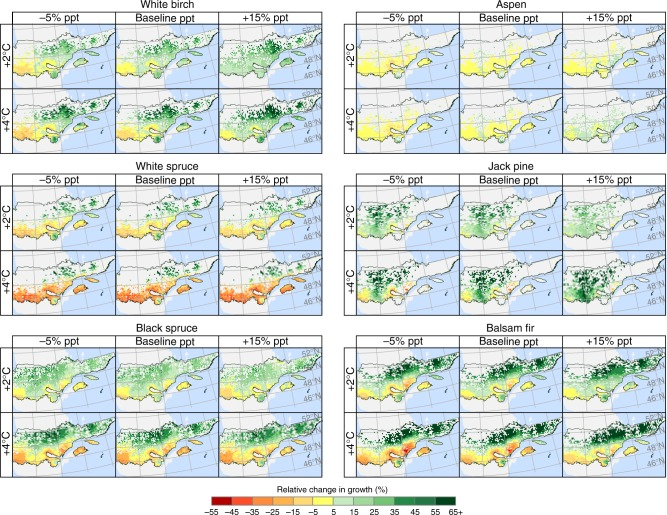
The response of six tree species common in Quebec's forests to 2 °C (3.6 °F) and 4 °C (7.2 °F) warming under different precipitation levels.

It has been hypothesized that the boreal environments have only a few states which are stable in the long term - a treeless tundra/steppe, a forest with >75% tree cover and an open woodland with ~20% and ~45% tree cover. Thus, continued climate change would be able to force at least some of the presently existing taiga forests into one of the two woodland states or even into a treeless steppe - but it could also shift tundra areas into woodland or forest states as they warm and become more suitable for tree growth. Consistent with that, a Landsat analysis of 100,000 undisturbed sites found that the areas with low tree cover became greener in response to warming, but areas with a lot of trees got more "brown" as some of them died due to the same.

In Alaska, the growth of white spruce trees is stunted by unusually warm summers, while trees on some of the coldest fringes of the forest are experiencing faster growth than previously. At a certain stage, such shifts could become effectively irreversible, making them tipping points in the climate system, and a major assessment designated both processes - reversion of southern boreal forests to grasslands and the conversion of tundra areas to boreal forest - as separate examples of such, which would likely become unstoppable around 4 °C (7.2 °F), though they would still take at least 50 years, if not a century or more. However, the certainty level is still limited; there's an outside possibility that 1.5 °C (2.7 °F) would be enough to lock in either of the two shifts; on the other hand, reversion to grassland may require 5 °C (9.0 °F), and the replacement of tundra 7.2 °C (13.0 °F).

Forest expansion is likely to take longer than decline, as juveniles of boreal species are the worst-affected by the climate shifts, while the temperate species capable of replacing them have slower growth rates. Disappearance of forest also causes detectable carbon emissions, while gain acts as a carbon sink: yet the changes in albedo more than outweigh that in terms of climate impact.

=== Temperate forests ===
Globally, wildfires and deforestation have reduced forests' net absorption of greenhouse gases, reducing their effectiveness at mitigating climate change. Global warming increases forest fires that release more greenhouse gases, creating a feedback loop that causes more warming.

Gavin Newsom (governor of California since 2019) talks about climate change at North Complex Fire in 2020.

In the western U.S., since 1986, longer, warmer summers have resulted in a fourfold increase in major wildfires and a sixfold increase in the area of forest burned, compared to the period from 1970 to 1986. While fire suppression policies have played a substantial role as well, both healthy and unhealthy forests now face an increased risk of forest fires because of the warming climate.

A 2018 study found that trees grow faster due to increased carbon dioxide levels; however, the trees are also 8–12 percent lighter and denser since 1900. The authors note, "Even though a greater volume of wood is being produced today, it now contains less material than just a few decades ago."

==== Expansion of beetles that can harm trees ====
Historically, a few days of extreme cold would kill most mountain pine beetles and keep their outbreaks contained. Since 1998, the lack of severe winters in British Columbia had enabled a devastating pine beetle infestation, which had killed 33 million acres or 135,000 km^{2} by 2008; a level an order of magnitude larger than any previously recorded outbreak. Such losses can match an average year of forest fires in all of Canada or five years worth of emissions from its transportation.

Climate change and the associated changing weather patterns occurring worldwide have a direct effect on biology, population ecology, and the population of eruptive insects, such as the mountain pine beetle. This is because temperature is a factor which determines insect development and population success. Prior to climatic and temperature changes, the mountain pine beetle predominately lived and attacked lodgepole and ponderosa pine trees at lower elevations, as the higher elevation Rocky Mountains and Cascades were too cold for their survival. Under normal seasonal freezing weather conditions in the lower elevations, the forest ecosystems that pine beetles inhabit are kept in balance by factors such as tree defense mechanisms, beetle defense mechanisms, and freezing temperatures. It is a simple relationship between a host (the forest), an agent (the beetle) and the environment (the weather and temperature). However, as climate change causes mountain areas to become warmer and drier, pine beetles have more power to infest and destroy the forest ecosystems, such as the whitebark pine forests of the Rocky Mountains. Increased temperatures also allow the pine beetle to increase their life cycle by 100%: it only takes a single year instead of two for the pine beetle to develop. As the Rockies have not adapted to deal with pine beetle infestations, they lack the defenses to fight the beetles.

=== Tropical forests ===
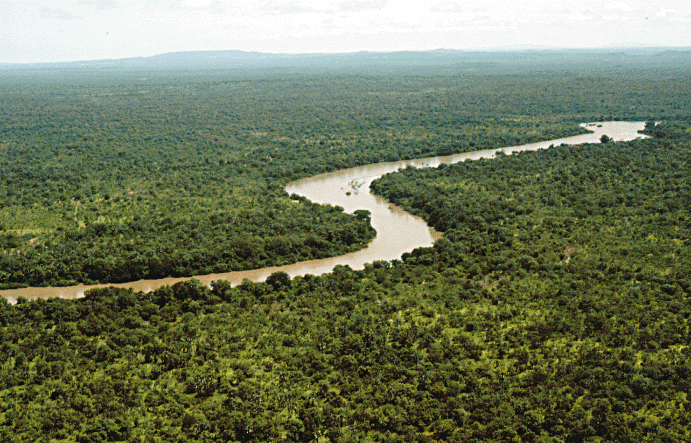
Rainforest ecosystems are rich in biodiversity. This is the Gambia River in Senegal's Niokolo-Koba National Park.

The Amazon rainforest is the largest tropical rainforest in the world. It is twice as big as India and spans nine countries in South America. This size allows it to produce around half of its own rainfall by recycling moisture through evaporation and transpiration as air moves across the forest; tree losses interfere with that capability, to the point where if enough is lost, much of the rest will likely die off and transform into a dry savanna landscape. For now, deforestation of the Amazon rainforest has been the greatest threat to it, and the main reason why, as of 2022, about 20% of it had been deforested and another 6% "highly degraded". Yet, climate change is also a threat as it exacerbates wildfire and interferes with precipitation. It is considered likely that hitting 3.5 °C (6.3 °F) of global warming would trigger the collapse of rainforest to savannah over the course of around a century (50-200) years, although it occur at between 2 °C (3.6 °F) to 6 °C (11 °F) of warming.

Forest fires in Indonesia have dramatically increased since 1997 as well. These fires are often actively started to clear forest for agriculture. They can set fire to the large peat bogs in the region and the CO_{2} released by these peat bog fires has been estimated, in an average year, to be 15% of the quantity of CO_{2} produced by fossil fuel combustion.

One of the main concerns is the loss of endangered species, mostly because of the increasing heat found in tropical forests.

Research suggests that slow-growing trees are only stimulated in growth for a short period under higher CO_{2} levels, while faster growing plants like liana benefit in the long term. In general, but especially in rainforests, this means that liana become the prevalent species; and because they decompose much faster than trees their carbon content is more quickly returned to the atmosphere. Slow growing trees incorporate atmospheric carbon for decades.

== Freshwater biomes ==
=== Lakes ===
Warmer-than-ideal conditions result in higher metabolism and consequent reductions in body size despite increased foraging, which in turn elevates the risk of predation. Indeed, even a slight increase in temperature during development impairs growth efficiency and survival rate in rainbow trout.

In 2023, a study looked at freshwater fish in 900 lakes of the American state of Minnesota. It found that if their water temperature increases by 4 °C (7.2 °F) in July (said to occur under approximately the same amount of global warming), then cold-water fish species like cisco would disappear from 167 lakes, which represents 61% of their habitat in Minnesota. Cool-water yellow perch would see its numbers decline by about 7% across all of Minnesota's lakes, while warm-water bluegill would increase by around 10%.

=== Rivers ===
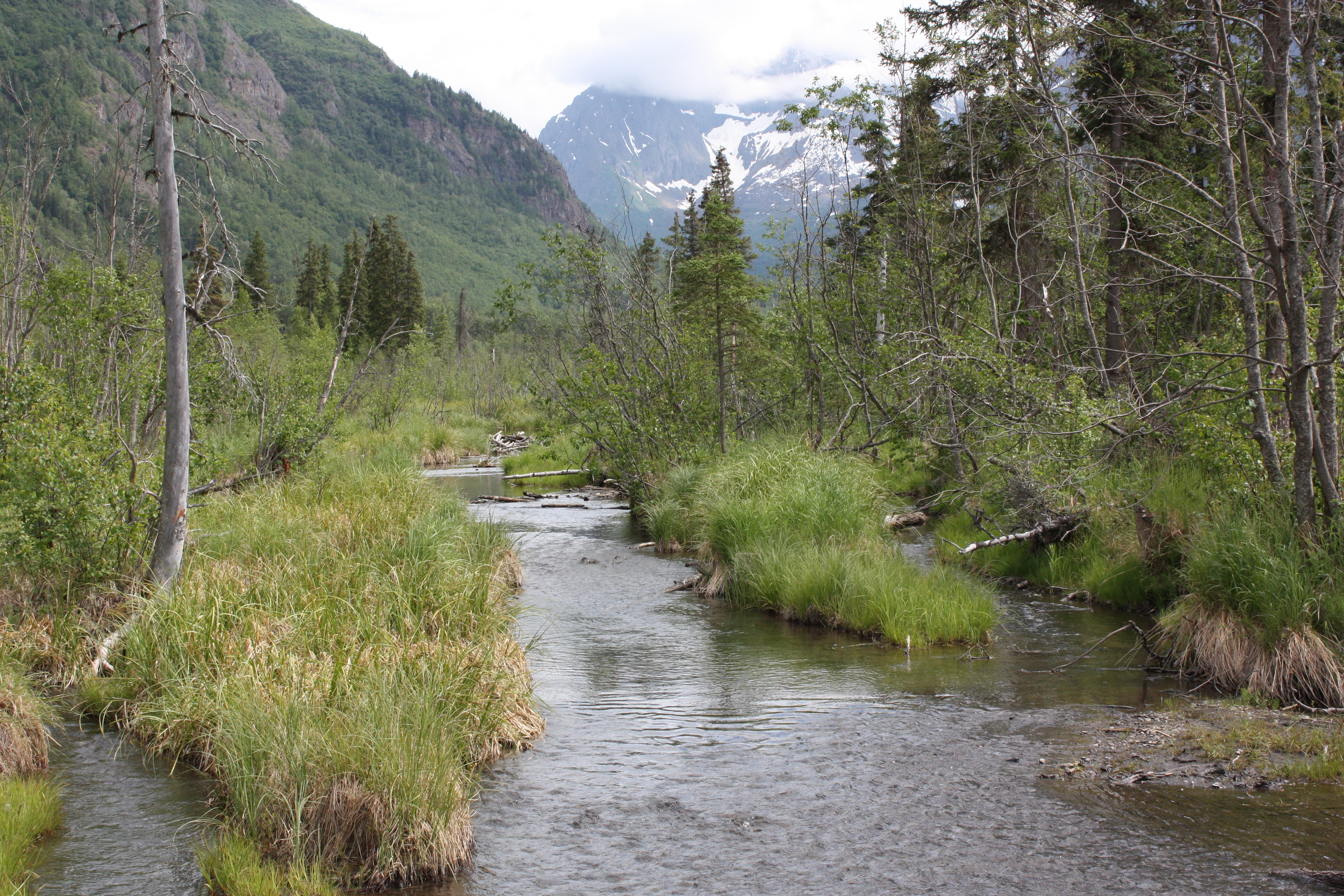
Eagle River in central Alaska, home to various indigenous freshwater species.

Many species of freshwater and saltwater plants and animals are dependent on glacier-fed waters to ensure a cold water habitat that they have adapted to. Some species of freshwater fish need cold water to survive and to reproduce, and this is especially true with salmon and cutthroat trout. Reduced glacier runoff can lead to insufficient stream flow to allow these species to thrive. Ocean krill, a cornerstone species, prefer cold water and are the primary food source for aquatic mammals such as the blue whale.

In general, freshwater bodies such as streams can be strongly affected by heatwaves. However, the impact could vary strongly depending on the presence or absence of predators in the stream community. In their absence, the impacts are much more severe and the local extinction of most species could occur, homogenizing the community. Species of fish living in cold or cool water can see a reduction in population of up to 50% in the majority of U.S. freshwater streams, according to most climate change models. The increase in metabolic demands due to higher water temperatures, in combination with decreasing amounts of food will be the main contributors to their decline. Additionally, many fish species (such as salmon) use seasonal water levels of streams as a means of reproducing, typically breeding when water flow is high and migrating to the ocean after spawning. Because snowfall is expected to be reduced due to climate change, water runoff is expected to decrease which leads to lower flowing streams, affecting the spawning of millions of salmon. To add to this, rising seas will begin to flood coastal river systems, converting them from fresh water habitats to saline environments where indigenous species will likely perish. In southeast Alaska, the sea rises by 3.96 cm/year, redepositing sediment in various river channels and bringing salt water inland. This rise in sea level not only contaminates streams and rivers with saline water, but also the reservoirs they are connected to, where species such as sockeye salmon live. Although this species of Salmon can survive in both salt and fresh water, the loss of a body of fresh water stops them from reproducing in the spring, as the spawning process requires fresh water.

In freshwater ecosystems, climate warming drives bidirectional and asymmetric shifts in fish distributions. For example, in the Volga-Kama basin, "southern" Ponto-Caspian species are actively expanding their ranges northward into newly formed reservoir habitats, while "northern" cold-adapted species (such as vendace and European smelt) are experiencing significant range regression due to increasing water temperatures and altered thermal dynamics.

== Marine biomes ==
=== Polar waters ===
In the Arctic, the waters of Hudson Bay are ice-free for three weeks longer than they were thirty years ago, affecting polar bears, which prefer to hunt on sea ice. Species that rely on cold weather conditions such as gyrfalcons, and snowy owls that prey on lemmings that use the cold winter to their advantage may be negatively affected.

=== Coral reefs ===
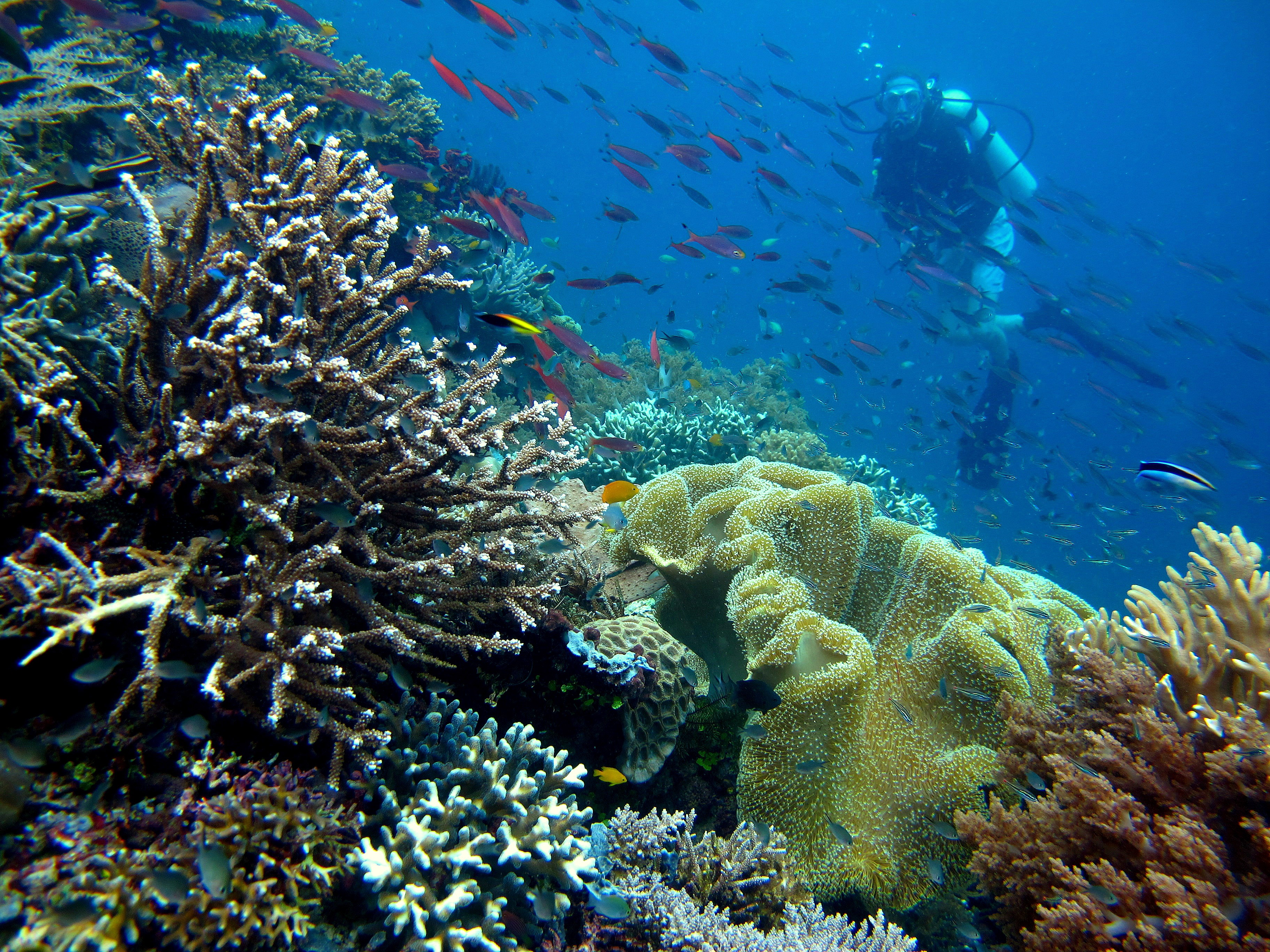
Coral reefs off Raja Ampat Islands in New Guinea

Almost no other ecosystem is as vulnerable to climate change as coral reefs. Updated 2022 estimates show that even at a global average increase of 1.5 °C (2.7 °F) over pre-industrial temperatures, only 0.2% of the world's coral reefs would still be able to withstand marine heatwaves, as opposed to 84% being able to do so now, with the figure dropping to 0% by 2 °C (3.6 °F) and beyond. However, it was found in 2021 that each square meter of coral reef area contains about 30 individual corals, and their total number is estimated at half a trillion - equivalent to all the trees in the Amazon, or all the birds in the world. As such, most individual coral reef species are predicted to avoid extinction even as coral reefs would cease to function as the ecosystems we know. A 2013 study found that 47–73 coral species (6–9%) are vulnerable to climate change while already threatened with extinction according to the IUCN Red List, and 74–174 (9–22%) coral species were not vulnerable to extinction at the time of publication, but could be threatened under continued climate change, making them a future conservation priority. The authors of the recent coral number estimates suggest that those older projections were too high, although this has been disputed.

== See also ==
- Woody plant encroachment
