= Alternative stable state =

Ecological concept

In ecology, the theory of alternative stable states (sometimes termed alternate stable states or alternative stable equilibria) predicts that ecosystems can exist under multiple "states" (sets of unique biotic and abiotic conditions). These alternative states are non-transitory and therefore considered stable over ecologically-relevant timescales. Ecosystems may transition from one stable state to another, in what is known as a state shift (sometimes termed a phase shift or regime shift), when perturbed. Due to ecological feedbacks, ecosystems display resistance to state shifts and therefore tend to remain in one state unless perturbations are large enough. Multiple states may persist under equal environmental conditions, a phenomenon known as hysteresis. Alternative stable state theory suggests that discrete states are separated by ecological thresholds, in contrast to ecosystems which change smoothly and continuously along an environmental gradient.

== Theory ==
Alternative stable state theory was first proposed by Richard Lewontin (1969), but other early key authors include Holling (1973), Sutherland (1974), May (1977), and Scheffer et al. (2001). In the broadest sense, alternative stable state theory proposes that a change in ecosystem conditions can result in an abrupt shift in the state of the ecosystem, such as a change in population (Barange, M. et al. 2008) or community composition. Ecosystems can persist in states that are considered stable (i.e., can exist for relatively long periods of time). Intermediate states are considered unstable and are, therefore, transitory. Because ecosystems are resistant to state shifts, significant perturbations are usually required to overcome ecological thresholds and cause shifts from one stable state to another. The resistance to state shifts is known as "resilience" (Holling 1973).

State shifts are often illustrated heuristically by the ball-in-cup model (Holling, C.S. et al., 1995) Biodiversity in the functioning of ecosystems: an ecological synthesis. In Biodiversity Loss, Ecological and Economical Issues (Perrings, C.A. et al., eds), pp. 44–83, Cambridge University Press). A ball, representing the ecosystem, exists on a surface where any point along the surface represents a possible state. In the simplest model, the landscape consists of two valleys separated by a hill. When the ball is in a valley, or a "domain of attraction", it exists in a stable state and must be perturbed to move from this state. In the absence of perturbations, the ball will always roll downhill and therefore will tend to stay in the valley (or stable state). State shifts can be viewed from two different viewpoints, the "community perspective" and the "ecosystem perspective". The ball can only move between stable states in two ways: (1) moving the ball or (2) altering the landscape. The community perspective is analogous to moving the ball, while the ecosystem perspective is analogous to altering the landscape.

These two viewpoints consider the same phenomenon with different mechanisms. The community perspective considers ecosystem variables (which change relatively quickly and are subject to feedbacks from the system), whereas the ecosystem perspective considers ecosystem parameters (which change relatively slowly and operate independently of the system). The community context considers a relatively constant environment in which multiple stable states are accessible to populations or communities. This definition is an extension of stability analysis of populations (e.g., Lewontin 1969; Sutherland 1973) and communities (e.g., Drake 1991; Law and Morton 1993). The ecosystem context focuses on the effect of exogenous "drivers" on communities or ecosystems (e.g., May 1977; Scheffer et al. 2001; Dent et al. 2002). Both definitions are explored within this article.

== Ecological community ==
Ecosystems can shift from one state to another via a significant perturbation directly to state variables. State variables are quantities that change quickly (in ecologically-relevant time scales) in response to feedbacks from the system (i.e., they are dependent on system feedbacks), such as population densities. This perspective requires that different states can exist simultaneously under equal environmental conditions, since the ball moves only in response to a state variable change.

For example, consider a very simple system with three microbial species. It may be possible for the system to exist under different community structure regimes depending on initial conditions (e.g., population densities or spatial arrangement of individuals) (Kerr et al. 2002). Perhaps under certain initial densities or spatial configurations, one species dominates over all others, while under different initial conditions all species can mutually coexist. Because the different species interact, changes in populations affect one another synergistically to determine community structure. Under both states the environmental conditions are identical. Because the states have resilience, following small perturbations (e.g., changes to population size) the community returns to the same configuration while large perturbations may induce a shift to another configuration.

The community perspective requires the existence of alternative stable states (i.e., more than one valley) before the perturbation, since the landscape is not changing. Because communities have some level of resistance to change, they will stay in their domain of attraction (or stable state) until the perturbation is large enough to force the system into another state. In the ball-and-cup model, this would be the energy required to push the ball up and over a hill, where it would fall downhill into a different valley.

== Ecosystem ==
It is also possible to cause state shifts in another context, by indirectly affecting state variables. This is known as the ecosystem perspective. This perspective requires a change in environmental parameters that affect the behavior of state variables. For example, birth rate, death rate, migration, and density-dependent predation indirectly alter the ecosystem state by changing population density (a state variable). Ecosystem parameters are quantities that are unresponsive (or respond very slowly) to feedbacks from the system (i.e., they are independent of system feedbacks). The stable state landscape is changed by environmental drivers, which may result in a change in the quantity of stable states and the relationship between states.

By the ecosystem perspective, the landscape of the ecological states is changed, which forces a change in the ecosystem state. Changing the landscape can modify the number, location, and resilience of stable states, as well as the unstable intermediate states. By this view, the topography in the ball-and-cup model is not static, as it is in the community perspective. This is a fundamental difference between the two perspectives.

Although the mechanisms of community and ecosystem perspectives are different, the empirical evidence required for documentation of alternative stable states is the same. In addition, state shifts are often a combination of internal processes and external forces (Scheffer et al. 2001). For example, consider a stream-fed lake in which the pristine state is dominated by benthic vegetation. When upstream construction releases soils into the stream, the system becomes turbid. As a result, benthic vegetation cannot receive light and decline, increasing nutrient availability and allowing phytoplankton to dominate. In this state shift scenario the state variables changing are the populations of benthic vegetation and phytoplankton, and the ecosystem parameters are turbidity and nutrient levels. So, whether identifying mechanisms of variables or parameters is a matter of formulation (Beisner et al. 2003).

== Hysteresis effects ==
Hysteresis is an important concept in alternative stable state theory. In this ecological context, hysteresis refers to the existence of different stable states under the same variables or parameters. Hysteresis can be explained by "path-dependency", in which the equilibrium point for the trajectory of "A → B" is different from for "B → A". In other words, it matters which way the ball is moving across the landscape. Some ecologists (e.g., Scheffer et al. 2001) argue that hysteresis is a prerequisite for the existence of alternative stable states. Others (e.g., Beisner et al. 2003) claim that this is not so; although shifts often involve hysteresis, a system can show alternative stable states yet have equal paths for "A → B" and "B → A".

Hysteresis can occur via changes to variables or parameters. When variables are changed the ball is pushed from one domain of attraction to another, yet the same push from the other direction cannot return the ball to the original domain of attraction. When parameters are changed a modification to the landscape results in a state shift, but reversing the modification does not result in a reciprocal shift.

A real-world example of hysteresis is helpful to illustrate the concept. Coral reef systems can dramatically shift from pristine coral-dominated systems to degraded algae-dominated systems when populations grazing on algae decline. The 1983 crash of sea urchin populations in Caribbean reef systems released algae from top-down (herbivory) control, allowing them to overgrow corals and resulting in a shift to a degraded state. When urchins rebounded, the high (pre-crash) coral cover levels did not return, indicating hysteresis (Mumby et al. 2007).

In some cases, state shifts under hysteresis may be irreversible. For example, tropical cloud forests require high moisture levels, provided by clouds that are intercepted by the canopy (via condensation). When deforested, moisture delivery ceases. Therefore, reforestation is often unsuccessful because conditions are too dry to allow the trees to grow (Wilson & Agnew 1992). Even in cases where there is no obvious barrier to recovery, alternative states can be remarkably persistent: an experimental grassland heavily fertilized for 10 years lost much of its biodiversity, and was still in this state 20 years later (Isbell et al. 2013).

== Resilience ==
By their very nature, basins of attraction display resilience. Ecosystems are resistant to state shifts – they will only undergo shifts under substantial perturbations – but some states are more resilient than others. In the ball-and-cup model, a valley with steep sides has greater resilience than a shallow valley, since it would take more force to push the ball up the hill and out of the valley.

Resilience can change in stable states when environmental parameters are shifted. Often, humans influence stable states by reducing the resilience of basins of attraction. There are at least three ways in which anthropogenic forces reduce resilience (Folke et al. 2004): (1) Decreasing diversity and functional groups, often by top-down effects (e.g., overfishing); (2) altering the physico-chemical environment (e.g., climate change, pollution, fertilization); or (3) modifying disturbance regimes to which organisms are adapted (e.g., bottom trawling, coral mining, etc.). When the resilience is decreased, ecosystems can be pushed into alternative, and often less-desirable, stable states with only minor perturbations. When hysteresis effects are present, the return to a more-desirable state is sometimes impossible or impractical (given management constraints). Shifts to less-desirable states often entail a loss of ecosystem service and function, and have been documented in an array of terrestrial, marine, and freshwater environments (reviewed in Folke et al. 2004).

== Evidence ==
Most work on alternative stable states has been theoretical, using mathematical models and simulations to test ecological hypotheses. Other work has been conducted using empirical evidence from surveying, historical records, or comparisons across spatial scales. There has been a lack of direct, manipulative experimental tests for alternative stable states. This is especially true for studies outside of controlled laboratory conditions, where state shifts have been documented for cultures of microorganisms.

Verifying the existence of alternative stable states carries profound implications for ecosystem management. If stable states exist, gradual changes in environmental factors may have little effect on a system until a threshold is reached, at which point a catastrophic state shift may occur. Understanding the nature of these thresholds will help inform the design of monitoring programs, ecosystem restoration, and other management decisions. Managers are particularly interested in the potential of hysteresis, since it may be difficult to recover from a state shift (Beisner et al. 2003). The mechanisms of feedback loops that maintain stable states are important to understand if we hope to effectively manage an ecosystem with alternative stable states.

=== Empirical evidence ===
Empirical evidence for the existence of alternative stable states is vital to advancing the idea beyond theory. Schröder et al. (2005) reviewed the current ecological literature for alternative stable states and found 35 direct experiments, of which only 21 were deemed valid. Of these, 62% (14) showed evidence for and 38% (8) showed no evidence for alternative stable states. However, the Schröder et al. (2005) analysis required evidence of hysteresis, which is not necessarily a prerequisite for alternative stable states. Other authors (e.g., Scheffer et al. 2001; Folke et al. 2004) have had less-stringent requirements for the documentation of alternative stable states.

State shifts via the community perspective have been induced experimentally by the addition or removal of predators, such as in Paine's (1966) work on keystone predators (i.e., predators with disproportionate influence on community structure) in the intertidal zone (although this claim is refuted by Schröder et al. 2005). Also, Beisner et al. (2003) suggest that commercially exploited fish populations can be forced between alternative stable states by fishing pressure due to Allee effect that work at very low population sizes. Once a fish population falls below a certain threshold, it will inevitably go extinct when low population densities make replacement of adults impossible due to, for example, the inability to find mates or density-dependent mortality. Since populations cannot return from extinction, this is an example of an irreversible state shift.

Although alternative stable state theory is still in its infancy, empirical evidence has been collected from a variety of biomes:

- The Sahara region, once vegetated, suddenly collapsed into a desert about 5,000 to 6,000 years ago due to climate change (Scheffer and Carpenter 2003). Recent alteration of disturbance states via fire suppression has caused state shifts in fire-adapted ecosystems of the southeastern United States (Peterson 2002).
- In the northeastern United States alternative stable states have been experimentally documented in hardwood forest food webs (Schmitz 2004). Spiders exhibit top-down control on generalist herbivore grasshoppers, causing them to hide in and forage on a competitively dominant plant species. Herbivory on the superior plant competitor reduces dominance, thereby increasing plant diversity. Under experimental removal of spiders, grasshoppers were released from predation and consumed plants without preference for the competitively-superior species. This top competitor outcompeted other species, resulting in lower overall plant diversity. Furthermore, reintroductions of spiders failed to return the system to high plant diversity, indicating ecological thresholds.
- Ponds, lakes, and other small bodies of water are ideal for studying alternative stable states because they are relatively self-contained (Holling 1973). There has been great interest in state shifts in shallow temperate lakes between clear-water and turbid-water states. Nutrient loading can shift clear lakes to turbid systems by causing phytoplankton blooms (Scheffer 1997). Feedbacks maintaining the turbid state include shading out benthic macrophytes, which otherwise stabilize sediments and reduce rapid nutrient cycling. Hysteresis may occur if reductions in nutrient input do not return the clear-water state.
- Alternative stable states have also been shown for freshwater faunal communities. Initial conditions, such as densities of snails, can influence the movement of an ecosystem into one of several alternative stable equilibria (Chase 2003).
- Additionally, alternative stable states have been documented experimentally in coastal marine ecosystems. Arctic salt marshes of Hudson Bay, Manitoba have been shown to shift from a vegetated state to an unvegetated state due to overgrazing by snow geese (Handa, Harmsen & Jefferies 2002). When geese were experimentally removed, recovery of the system only occurred under ideal soil conditions, indicating hysteresis.
