= Brian Walker (ecologist) =

Australian ecologist

Brian Harrison Walker AO
- Citizenship: Australian
- Education: University of Saskatchewan (PhD)
- Known for: Social-ecological systems; Resilience Alliance leadership; Global change science
- Scientific career
- Fields: Ecology, Sustainability, Resilience Theory
- Workplaces: University of Rhodesia; University of the Witwatersrand; CSIRO; Resilience Alliance
- Thesis: (1968)

Brian Harrison Walker AO is an Australian scientist specialising in ecological sustainability and resilience in socio-ecological systems.

== Education and academic career ==
Brian Walker began his scientific career in Rhodesia (now Zimbabwe), where his research was on ecosystem function and dynamics in tropical savannas and rangelands. He earned his Ph.D. in the University of Saskatchewan, in Canada in 1968.

He was a Lecturer and Senior Lecturer at the University of Rhodesia, Rhodesia from 1969 until 1975. After that he was a professor at the University of the Witwatersrand, before moving to Australia in 1985. There he became Chief of the former CSIRO Division of Wildlife and Ecology (now CSIRO Sustainable Ecosystems) from 1985-1999.

He has also made significant contributions to global change science. Serving as the Chair of the Scientific Steering Committee of the IGBP core project on Global Change and Terrestrial Ecosystems (GCTE), from 1990–1997 and Chair of the Board, Beijer International Institute of Ecological Economics, Royal Swedish Academy of Sciences from 1999-2002.

He is currently a Research Fellow with CSIRO Sustainable Ecosystems and is also Program Director and Chair of the Board of the Resilience Alliance, an international research group working on sustainability of social-ecological systems.

== Publications ==
Brian Walker has co-authored two books and published more than 160 scientific papers. He also edited and co-edited nine books.

Books

- 2006 with David Salt: Resilience thinking: Sustaining ecosystems and people in a changing world, Island Press
- 2012 with David Salt: Resilience practice: Building capacity to absorb disturbance and maintain function, Island Press

His most cited papers include:

- 1981 with D. Ludwig, C. S. Holling and R Peterman. "Stability of semi-arid savanna grazing systems" Journal of Ecology Vol 69 : 473-498.
- 1985 with W.T. Knoop "Interactions of woody and herbaceous vegetation in southern African savanna" in Journal of Ecology Vol 73 : 235-253.
- 1989 with M. Westoby I. Noy-Meir. "Opportunistic management for rangelands not at equilibrium. in Journal of Range Management Vol 42(4) : 266-274.
- 1992 "Biodiversity and ecological redundancy" Conservation Biology Vol 6: 18-23.
- 2001 with M. Scheffer, S.R. Carpenter, J. Foley, and C. Folke. "Catastrophic shifts in ecosystems" in Nature Vol 413: 591-596.

== Awards ==
In 1991, Walker was elected a Fellow of the Australian Academy of Technological Sciences and Engineering.

In 1999, Walker received the Ecological Society of Australia's Gold Medal for his work on ecology of tropical savannahs and rangelands.

In 2013, Walker was elected a Fellow of the Australian Academy of Science.

In 2018, Walker has been awarded the Blue Planet Prize for 2018, along with Professor Malin Falkenmark. The award goes to individuals or organizations that make "outstanding achievements in scientific research and in so doing help to solve global environmental problems."

In 2020, Walker was made an Officer (AO) in the General Division of the Order of Australia for "distinguished service to science, particularly to ecosystem ecology and research, and to professional scientific bodies."
