= Craig R. Allen =

American resilience scientist and ecology professor

- Education: University of Wisconsin–Green Bay (B.S.); Texas Tech University (M.S.); University of Florida (Ph.D.)
- Known for: Research on land-use change, biological invasions, ecosystem resilience, adaptive management
- Scientific career
- Fields: Resilience science; ecology; social–ecological systems; invasion ecology
- Institutions: University of Nebraska–Lincoln (School of Natural Resources)

Craig R. Allen is an American ecologist and resilience scientist. He is a Research Professor and Resilience Scientist in the School of Natural Resources at the University of Nebraska–Lincoln (UNL) and Director of the Center for Resilience in Agricultural Working Landscapes (CRAWL). His research explores interactions among land-use change, biological invasions, ecosystem resilience and adaptive management in social–ecological systems.

== Early life and education ==
Allen was born in Berkeley, California, and raised in Madison, Wisconsin. He earned a B.S. in biology from the University of Wisconsin–Green Bay (1989), an M.S. in Wildlife Science from Texas Tech University (1993), and a Ph.D. in Wildlife Ecology from the University of Florida (1997).

== Academic career ==
Allen began his academic career with a non-tenure-track appointment in the Department of Zoology at the University of Florida. He then served with the South Carolina Cooperative Fish and Wildlife Research Unit at Clemson University as Assistant Leader (1998–2001) and Leader (2002–2004). In July 2004, he joined UNL's School of Natural Resources as a Research Professor and later became Director of CRAWL. At UNL he teaches graduate-level courses on resilience science and biological invasions, supervises master's and doctoral students, and leads interdisciplinary programs in adaptive management and resilience of working landscapes.

== Research and contributions ==
Allen's research investigates how land-use and land-cover change drive biological invasions and extinctions, how these processes affect ecosystem resilience, and how adaptive management can be implemented across scales in agricultural and rangeland systems. He is associated with advancing applications of panarchy and the adaptive cycle, the quantification of spatial resilience, and linking resilience concepts to management. He has published >250 articles and 5 books. His work has been widely cited; according to his Google Scholar profile, his publications have received more than 18,000 citations (as of late 2025).

Allen has served as an Editor-in-Chief of the resilience and social-ecological systems scientific research journal Ecology and Society since 2021.

== Honours and recognition ==
- Fellow of the American Association for the Advancement of Science (AAAS), class of 2020, “for distinguished contributions to resilience theory and its application to conservation and resource management, as well as the advancement of science through teaching and service.”
- Member, Board of Directors, Resilience Alliance, 2024–2025.
- Director, Center for Resilience in Agricultural Working Landscapes (CRAWL), UNL.

== Selected publications ==
1. Peterson, Garry D.; Allen, Craig R.; Holling, C. S. (1998). "Ecological resilience, biodiversity, and scale". Ecosystems. 1 (1): 6–18. doi:10.1007/s100219900002.
2. Allen, Craig R.; Epperson, David M.; Garmestani, Ahjond S. (2004). "Red Imported Fire Ant Impacts on Wildlife: A Decade of Research". The American Midland Naturalist. 152 (1): 88–103. doi:10.1674/0003-0031(2004)152[0088:RIFAIO]2.0.CO;2.
3. Allen, Craig R.; Fontaine, Joseph J.; Pope, Kevin L.; Garmestani, Ahjond S. (2011). "Adaptive management for a turbulent future". Journal of Environmental Management. 92 (5): 1339–1345. Bibcode:2011JEnvM..92.1339A. doi:10.1016/j.jenvman.2010.11.019. PMID 21168260.
4. Allen, Craig R.; Gunderson, Lance H. (2011). "Pathology and failure in the design and implementation of adaptive management". Journal of Environmental Management. 92 (5): 1379–1384. Bibcode:2011JEnvM..92.1379A. doi:10.1016/j.jenvman.2010.10.063. PMID 21112687.
5. Allen, Craig R.; Angeler, David G.; Garmestani, Ahjond S.; Gunderson, Lance H.; Holling, C. S. (2014). "Panarchy: theory and application". Ecosystems. 17 (4): 578–589. Bibcode:2014Ecosy..17..578A. doi:10.1007/s10021-013-9744-2.
6. Cumming, Graeme S.; Allen, Craig R. (2017). "Protected areas as social-ecological systems: Perspectives from resilience and social-ecological systems theory". Ecological Applications. 27 (6): 1709–1717. Bibcode:2017EcoAp..27.1709C. doi:10.1002/eap.1584. PMID 28618079.
7. Allen, Craig R.; Angeler, David G.; Cumming, Graeme S.; Garmestani, Ahjond S. (2016). "Quantifying resilience". Journal of Applied Ecology. 53 (3): 625–635. doi:10.1111/1365-2664.12634.
8. Angeler, David G.; Chaffin, Brian C.; Sundstrom, Shana M.; Garmestani, Ahjond S.; Pope, Kevin L.; Uden, Daniel R.; Twidwell, Dirac; Allen, Craig R. (2020). "Coerced regimes: management challenges in the Anthropocene". Ecology and Society. 25 (1): 4. Bibcode:2020EcSoc..25..104A. doi:10.5751/ES-11286-250104. PMC 7286432. PMID 32523609.

== See also ==
- Resilience (ecology)
- Adaptive management
- Social-ecological system
