= Ecological threshold =

Ecological inflection points

Ecological threshold is the point at which a relatively small change or disturbance in external conditions causes a rapid change in an ecosystem. When an ecological threshold has been passed, the ecosystem may no longer be able to return to its state by means of its inherent resilience. Crossing an ecological threshold often leads to rapid change of ecosystem health. Ecological threshold represent a non-linearity of the responses in ecological or biological systems to pressures caused by human activities or natural processes. Critical load, regime shift, critical transition and tipping point are examples of other closely related terms.

== Characteristics ==
Thresholds can be characterized as points or as zones. Zone-type thresholds imply a gradual shift or transition from one state to another rather than an abrupt change at a specific point. Ecological thresholds have caught attention because many cases of catastrophic worsening of conditions have proved to be difficult or nearly impossible to remedy (also known as points of no return). Ecological extinction is an example of a definitive point of no return.

Ecological thresholds are often characterized by hysteresis, which means the dependence of the state of a system on the history of its state. Even when the change is not irreversible, the return path from altered to original state can be drastically different from the development leading to the altered state.

Another related concept is panarchy. Panarchy views coupled human-natural systems as a cross-scale set of adaptive cycles that reflect the dynamic nature of human and natural structures across time and space. Sudden shifts in ecosystem state can induce changes in human understanding of the way the systems need to be managed. These changes, in turn, may alter the institutions that carry out that management and as a result, some new changes occur in ecosystems.

== Detection ==
There are many different types of thresholds and detecting the occurrence of a threshold is not always straightforward. One approach is to process time series which are thought to display a shift in order to identify a possible jump. Methods have been developed to enhance and localize the jumps.

== Examples ==
Some examples of ecological thresholds, such as clear lakes turning into turbid ones, are well documented but many more probably exist. The thresholds database by Resilience Alliance and Santa Fe Institute includes over one hundred examples.

== See also ==
- Carrying capacity
- Catastrophe theory
- Dual-phase evolution suggests a mechanism underlying ecological thresholds and zones.
- Inflection point
- Tipping point (climatology)
- Gaia hypothesis
