= Crona =

Crona is a surname. Notable people with the surname include:

- Beatrice Crona (born 1974), Swedish economist
- Edvin Crona (born 2000), Swedish footballer
- Görel Crona (born 1959), Swedish film director and actress
- Gustaf Andersson (footballer, born 1979), Swedish footballer who changed his last name to Crona after the end of his career

== See also ==
- Krona (disambiguation)
- Cronay
