= Carl Folke =

Swedish environmental scientist (born 1955)

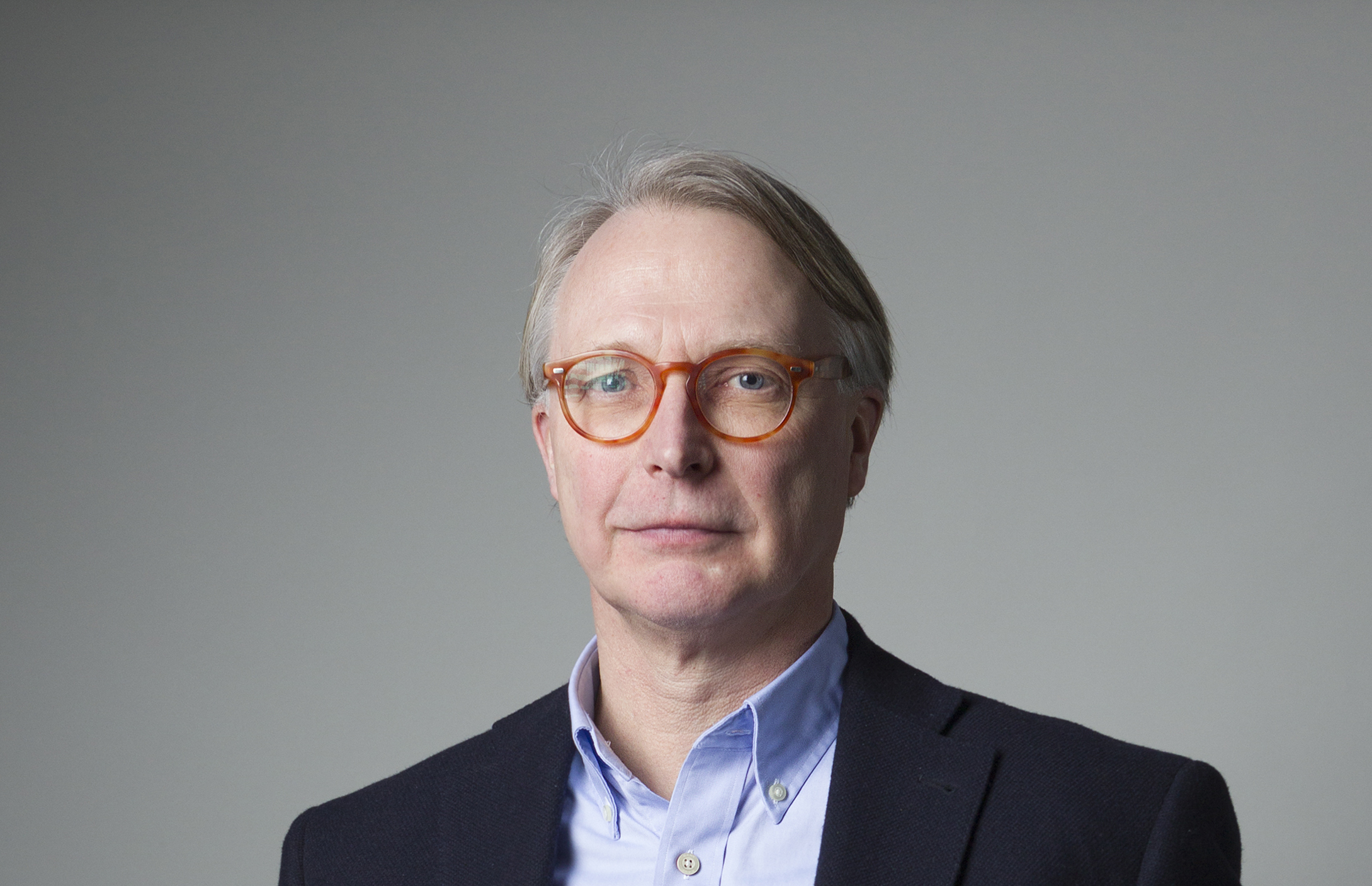
- Born: 26 June, 1955; Stockholm, Sweden
- Education: Stockholm University
- Awards: Gunnerus Sustainability Award
- Scientific career
- Fields: Social-ecological systems, Resilience
- Workplaces: Stockholm University, Stockholm Resilience Centre, Beijer Institute of Ecological Economics

Carl Folke (born Carl Bengt Malkolm Folke, 26 June, 1955 in Stockholm, Sweden), is a trans-disciplinary environmental scientist and a member of the Royal Swedish Academy of Sciences. He is a specialist in economics, resilience, and social-ecological systems, viewing such systems as intertwined and potentially unexpected in their interactions. As a framework for resource management, this perspective brings important insights to environmental management, urban planning, and climate adaptation. He suggests ways to improve our ability to understand complex social-ecological interactions, deal with change, and build resilience, often working at smaller scales as a step towards addressing larger scales.

Folke is the Director of the Beijer Institute of Ecological Economics of the Royal Swedish Academy of Sciences. He was the founding Science Director of the Stockholm Resilience Centre (2007-2023) and remains Chairman of the Board for the Centre.

== Biography ==
Folke earned his Ph.D. in 1990 in ecological economics/Natural Resource Management from the Department of Systems Ecology, Stockholm University, Stockholm, Sweden under the supervision of AnnMari Jansson. His Ph.D. work identified the ecosystem services that the Martebo mire provided for the island of Gotland before it was drained. Without the wetland's free naturally-powered resources, expensive fossil-fuel-based technological substitutes were needed for sewage treatment, pesticides and fertilizers, and water treatment.

Folke has continued his career in Stockholm, working for both Stockholm University and the Beijer Institute in a number of leadership role. He served as deputy director of the Beijer Institute of Ecological Economics of the Royal Swedish Academy of Sciences from 1991-1996. He became Chair of Natural Resource Management at the Department of Systems Ecology, Stockholm University in 1997, serving until 2007. He served as director of Stockholm University’s Center for Transdisciplinary Environmental Research (CTM) from 1999-2006.

In 2007, Folke became the Director of the Beijer Institute and the founding Science Director of the Stockholm Resilience Centre (SRC), formed in 2007 by the Beijer Institute at Stockholm University. In 2019, he became Chairman of the Board of the Stockholm Resilience Centre. In 2023 he stepped down as science director, and was succeeded by Beatrice Crona and Magnus Nyström. He continues to be Chairman of the Board of the Stockholm Resilience Centre.

Folke was elected member of the Royal Swedish Academy of Sciences in 2002 and serves on its Environmental Research Committee. He is among the founders of the Resilience Alliance. He was involved in the development of the International Society for Ecological Economics and contributed to Millennium Ecosystem Assessment. Folke served as Co-Editor in Chief of Ecology and Society (formerly Conservation Ecology) from 2002-2019.

== Awards ==
- 2017, Gunnerus Sustainability Award, Royal Norwegian Society of Sciences and Letters
- 2017, Member, Royal Norwegian Society of Sciences and Letters (DKNVS)
- 2017, Member, Royal Swedish Academy of Agriculture and Forestry (KSLA)
- 2017. International Member, U.S. National Academy of Sciences
- 2004, Sustainability Science Award, Ecological Society of America, co-author of the paper "Catastrophic shifts in ecosystems" in Nature, 413:591-596.
- 2002, Member, Royal Swedish Academy of Sciences
- 1995, Pew Scholar Award in conservation and the environment

== Publications (selection) ==
Folke has co-authored and edited 10 books and written over 200 scientific papers, over 15 of which have been published in Science and Nature. He has been among the top 1% of researchers by citations for field and year as assessed by Clarivate beginning in 2014.

=== Books ===
- Chapin, Kofinas, Folke (Eds.), Principles of Natural Resource Stewardship: Resilience-Based Management in a Changing World, Springer 2009, ISBN 978-0387730325.
- Berkes, Colding, Folke (Eds.), Navigating Social-Ecological Systems: Building Resilience for Complexity and Change. Cambridge University Press 2003, ISBN 978-0521061841.
- Berkes, Folke (Eds.), Linking Social and Ecological Systems: Management Practices and Social Mechanisms for Building Resilience. Cambridge University Press 1998, ISBN 978-0521785624.
- Andersson, Folke, Nyström, Trading with the Environment: Ecology, Economics, Institutions, and Policy Earthscan 1995, ISBN 978-1844079605.

=== Important journal papers ===
- Jørgensen, Peter Søgaard; Folke, Carl; Carroll, Scott P. (2019). "Evolution in the Anthropocene: Informing Governance and Policy". Annual Review of Ecology, Evolution, and Systematics. 50 (1): 527–546. Bibcode:2019AREES..50..527J. doi:10.1146/annurev-ecolsys-110218-024621. S2CID 202846760.
- Reyers, Belinda; Folke, Carl; Moore, Michele-Lee; Biggs, Reinette; Galaz, Victor (17 October 2018). "Social-Ecological Systems Insights for Navigating the Dynamics of the Anthropocene". Annual Review of Environment and Resources. 43 (1): 267–289. doi:10.1146/annurev-environ-110615-085349. ISSN 1543-5938. S2CID 158725564.
- Steffen et al., Planetary boundaries: Guiding human development on a changing planet. In: Science 347, No. 6223, (2015), doi:10.1126/science.1259855.
- Folke et al., Reconnecting to the Biosphere. In: Ambio 40, Issue 7, (2011), 719–738, doi:10.1007/s13280-011-0184-y.
- Steffen et al., The Anthropocene: From Global Change to Planetary Stewardship. In: Ambio 40, Issue 7, (2011), 739–761, doi:10.1007/s13280-011-0185-x.
- Folke et al., Resilience Thinking: Integrating Resilience, Adaptability and Transformability. In: Ecology and Society 15, Issue 4, (2010), Link.
- Rockström et al., A safe operating space for humanity. In: Nature 461, (2009), 472–475, doi:10.1038/461472a.
- Liu et al., Complexity of Coupled Human and Natural Systems. In: Science 317, No. 5844, (2007), 1513–1516, doi:10.1126/science.1144004.
- Worm et al., Impacts of Biodiversity Loss on Ocean Ecosystem Services. In: Science 314, No. 5800, (2006), 787-790, doi:10.1126/science.1132294.
- Folke, Resilience: The emergence of a perspective for social–ecological systems analyses. In: Global Environmental Change 16, Issue 3, (2006), 253–267, doi:10.1016/j.gloenvcha.2006.04.002.
- Folke et al., Adaptive governance of social-ecological systems. In: Annual Review of Environment and Resources 30, (2005), 441–473, doi:10.1146/annurev.energy.30.050504.144511.
- Hughes et al., Climate Change, Human Impacts, and the Resilience of Coral Reefs. In: Science 301, No. 5635, (2003), 929–933, doi:10.1126/science.1085046.
- Folke et al., Resilience and Sustainable Development: Building Adaptive Capacity in a World of Transformations. In: Ambio 31, Issue 5, (2002), 437–440, doi:10.1579/0044-7447-31.5.437.
- Scheffer et al., Catastrophic shifts in ecosystems. In: Nature 413, (2001), 591–596, doi:10.1038/35098000.
- Arrow et al., Economic growth, carrying capacity, and the environment. In: Ecological Economics 15, Issue 2 (1995), 91–95, doi:10.1016/0921-8009(95)00059-3.
