= Collaborative environmental governance =

Collaborative environmental governance is an approach to environmental governance which seeks to account for scale mismatch which may occur within social-ecological systems. It recognizes that interconnected human and biological systems exist on multiple geographic and temporal scales and thus CEG seeks to build collaboration among actors across multiple scales and jurisdictions.

== Benefits of CEG ==
Collaboration is a means to:

- enhance the generation of new knowledge through social learning,
- better integrate important insights from different knowledge systems,
- diffuse knowledge and best practices among a multitude of actors.

=== New Knowledge Generation through Social Learning ===
The uncertainty involved in ecosystem management and environmental governance requires that these systems be adaptable to new knowledge. Collaboration may facilitate this type of adaptivity through a process of social learning, by which new understandings are learned through interaction among individuals, and that change in those individuals understanding goes beyond that individual to change a communities understanding.

=== Integration of Different Knowledge Systems ===
By multiple actors collaborating across multiple knowledge systems, indigenous and traditional knowledge, environmental governance can benefit from the many communities that are not among the scientific community. Traditional knowledge may play a particularly important role in framing and scoping environmental issues, but also contribute to every aspect of the decision-making process.

There may also emerge a secondary benefit of higher perceptions fairness among actors which hold varied understandings of their environment. Increased perception of fairness regarding the decision-making process may lead to increased trust among actors, as well as reinforce collaboration itself.

=== Diffusion of Knowledge ===
Actors within a decision-making process and those who are affected by those processes do not always accept new knowledge or understanding easily. By developing networks of collaboration among various actors, new knowledge and understanding may be more readily diffused between disparate community networks.

== Challenges ==
Collaboration among stakeholders takes time and resources. Understanding when collaboration is an effective means of addressing problems within the decision making process is important in order to not over apply CEG. There are various issues within social-ecological systems which may hinder the effectiveness of CEG including:

- the immediate nature of some environmental issues,
- asymmetric power dynamics,
- increased conflict due to collaboration.

=== Immediate Nature of Environmental Issues ===
The temporal natures of social-ecological systems can lead to mismatch among the institutions and biophysical and social timescapes. Some environmental issues require immediate actions, while collaboration among actors requires overcoming initial barriers to collaboration, and the development of collaborative systems.

=== Asymmetric Power Dynamics ===
There are factors which may hinder the collaboration of institutions or actors which are rooted in the power structures which exist between them. Unfavorable contextual factors, unequal power relations, and weak interdependence may make collaboration unfeasible.

=== Increased Conflict ===
In situations in which large state actors are involved, Collaboration can be seen as co-optation or the marginalization of local or smaller actors. Collaborative approaches to environmental governance may intend to create interaction and cooperation between groups, but on the ground this can be experienced as abuses of power. Collaboration may also be undermined as a means of containing or derailing other forms of political conflict. In this case, collaboration is not a politically neutral process, but can be used to reinforce uneven power dynamics.
