= Resistance (ecology) =

Ability to withstand disturbance unchanged

In the context of ecological stability, resistance is the property of communities or populations to remain "essentially unchanged" when subject to disturbance. The inverse of resistance is sensitivity.

== Stability and disturbance ==
Resistance is one of the major aspects of ecological stability. Volker Grimm and Christian Wissel identified 70 terms and 163 distinct definitions of the various aspects of ecological stability, but found that they could be reduced to three fundamental properties: "staying essentially unchanged", "returning to the reference state...after a temporary disturbance" and "persistence through time of an ecological system." Resistant communities are able to remain "essentially unchanged" despite disturbance. Although commonly seen as distinct from resilience, Brian Walker and colleagues considered resistance to be a component of resilience in their expanded definition of resilience, while Fridolin Brand used a definition of resilience that he described as "close to the stability concept 'resistance', as identified by Grimm and Wissel (1997)". The inverse of resistance is sensitivity - sensitive species or communities show large changes when subject to environmental stress or disturbance.

However, anthropologist Munira Khayyat offers a new perspective on resistance in ecology beyond natural ecosystems. In her study of South Lebanon, she examines how plants and landscapes persist and adapt through cycles of war and occupation, introducing the concept of ‘resistant ecologies’. Unlike traditional definitions of ecological resistance, which often frame it as the ability to remain unchanged, Khayyat's concept demonstrates resistance as an adaptation to an ongoing state of instability, underscoring its distinctions with resilience. In contrast to resilience, which implies recovery after disturbance, resistance in this context refers to a continuous survival strategy in deadly environments such as war.

== Examples ==
In 1988, Hurricane Joan hit the rainforests along Nicaragua's Caribbean coast. Douglas Boucher and colleagues contrasted the resistant response of Qualea paraensis with the resilient response of Vochysia ferruginea; the mortality rate was low for Q. paraensis (despite extensive damage to the trees), but the growth rates of surviving trees were also low and few seedlings established. Despite the disturbance, populations were essentially unchanged. In contrast, V. ferruginea experienced very high rates of mortality in the hurricane but showed very high rates of seedling recruitment. As a result, population densities of the species increased. In their study of Jamaican montane forests affected by Hurricane Hugo in 1988, Peter Bellingham and colleagues used the degree of hurricane damage and the magnitude of the post-hurricane response to categorise tree species into four groups – resistant species (those with limited storm damage and low response), susceptible species (greater damage but low response), usurpers (limited damage but high response) and resilient species (greater damage and high response).

== Introduced species ==
English ecologist Charles Elton applied the term resistance to the ecosystem properties which limit the ability of introduced species to successfully invade communities. These properties include both abiotic factors like temperature and drought, and biotic factors including competition, parasitism, predation and the lack of necessary mutualists. Higher species diversity and lower resource availability can also contribute to resistance. Despite a substantial number of studies report observations of biotic resistance through species richness, the opposite may be observed in harsh environments (through mutualism), or at larger spatial scales, where species-area-relationships and habitat heterogeneity affect both, native and non-native species richness alike.
