= LARG SCM =

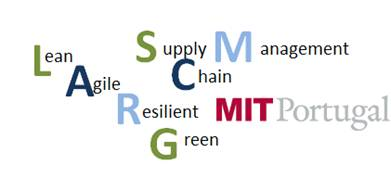
LARG SCM

LARG SCM is a business methodology that attempts to put together lean, agile, resilient, and green approaches in supply chain management. It was developed by the New University of Lisbon in Portugal.

Lean supply chain managements aims are to maintain close to zero inventories and reduce work in process; Agile goes for quick responses to customer inquiries and market changes while controlling costs and quality; resilience is about reacting quickly to disruptions impacting supply chain; and green refers to sustainability in supply chain through low emissions to the environment and a recycling strategy for products.

== History ==
The idea of LARG SCM was developed in the research unit of mechanical and industrial engineering (UNIDEMI) in the Faculty of Science and Technology at New University of Lisbon, Portugal. UNIDEMI is the main research center working on LARG SCM. UNINOVA and NECE are contributing partners.

== Methodology ==
A lean company means nearly zero inventories; a resilient company must have enough inventory to react to the effects of disruptions that may occur in a supply chain. These concepts seem to be contradictory. However, it would be ideal to have both systems working together in a company. These facts advise for further research in production and supply chain management; lean and resilient concepts require to be modeled on a compatibility basis.

LARG SCM develops a deep understanding of interrelationships (conflicts and trade-offs) across lean, agile, resilient and green supply chain paradigms. This understanding is believed to be vital to turn these concepts really compatible. This achievement will provide an important contribution for a competitive and sustainable environment; its justification will be based on better “lean, agile, resilient and green production systems” at the company level, with implications at the overall supply chain level and its agents.

LARG SCM encompasses a variety of related topics such as methodology, characteristics, organizational system, Performance measurement, human factors, information system, and management integration model.
