= Patricia Balvanera =

Mexican ecologist

- Education: Universidad Autónoma Metropolitana–Iztapalapa; UNAM
- Known for: Biodiversity and ecosystem services; social–ecological systems; transdisciplinary sustainability research
- Scientific career
- Fields: Ecology; sustainability science
- Workplaces: National Autonomous University of Mexico (UNAM)

Patricia Balvanera is a Mexican ecologist and professor at the National Autonomous University of Mexico (UNAM). Her research focuses on biodiversity, ecosystem services, and social–ecological systems. She is an Editor-in-Chief of the journal Ecology and Society.

== Early life and education ==
Balvanera studied biology at the Universidad Autónoma Metropolitana–Iztapalapa (UAM–Iztapalapa) and later earned both her M.Sc. and Ph.D. in ecology at UNAM.

== Academic career ==
Balvanera is a professor at UNAM’s Institute for Ecosystems and Sustainability Research (Instituto de Investigaciones en Ecosistemas y Sustentabilidad, IIES) in Morelia, Mexico, where her work examines links between biodiversity, ecosystem services and human well-being.

== Research ==
Balvanera’s research has addressed (among other topics) social-ecological systems, ecosystem services, biodiversity, secondary tropical forest dynamics, and the plural values of nature in society.

She has led syntheses, including the IPBES value's assessment related paper on nature’s diverse values, and work proposing “Essential Ecosystem Service Variables” (EESVs) for global monitoring.

== Positions ==
- Co-Chair and Coordinating Lead Author of the IPBES Assessment of the Diverse Values and Valuation of Nature (“Values Assessment”).
- Scientific Committee leadership of the Future Earth international research Programme on Ecosystem Change and Society (PECS).
- Leadership of the Ecosystem Services Working Group within the GEO BON.

== Editorial work ==
Balvanera is an Editor-in-Chief of the social-ecological systems science journal Ecology and Society.

== See also ==
- Ecosystem services
- IPBES
