= Gustaf Andersson =

Gustaf Andersson may refer to:

- Gustaf Andersson (footballer, born 1974), Swedish footballer
- Gustaf Andersson (footballer, born 1979), Swedish footballer
- Gustaf Andersson (politician) (1884–1961), Swedish politician
- Gustaf Andersson (speed skater) (1903–1986), Swedish speed skater
- Gustaf Andersson (sport shooter) (1885–1969), Swedish sport shooter
