= Resilience of coral reefs =

The resilience of coral reefs is the capacity of coral reefs to resist natural and anthropogenic disturbances such as storms and bleaching episodes, and recover after damage. Resilience refers to the ability of biological or social systems to maintain key functions or adapting to change in order to overcome pressures and stresses in the environment. It measures how well coral reefs tolerate changes in ocean chemistry, sea level, and sea surface temperature. Together, reef resistance and resilience influence coral reef recovery following disturbances such as ocean acidification. Natural reef resilience processes can be used as a recovery model for coral reefs and an opportunity for management in marine protected areas (MPAs).

== Mechanisms of resilience ==
=== Thermal tolerance ===
Many corals rely on a symbiotic algae called zooxanthellae for nutrient uptake through photosynthesis. Corals obtain about 60-85% of their total nutrition from symbiotic zooxanthellae. Slight increases in sea surface temperature can cause zooxanthellae to die. Coral hosts become bleached when they lose their zooxanthellae. Differences in symbionts, determined by genetic groupings (clades A-H), may explain thermal tolerance in corals. Research has shown that some corals contain thermally-resistant clades of zooxanthellae. Corals housing primarily clade D symbionts, and certain types of thermally resistant clade C symbionts, allow corals to avoid bleaching as severely as others experiencing the same stressor. Scientists remain in debate if thermal resistance in corals is due to mixing or shifting of symbionts, or thermally resistant vs. thermally-sensitive types of zooxanthellae. Species of coral housing multiple types of zooxanthellae can withstand a 1–1.5 °C change in temperature. However, few species of coral are known to house multiple types of zooxanthellae. Corals are more likely to contain clade D symbionts after multiple coral bleaching events.

=== Biodiversity and functional diversity ===
Biodiversity and functional diversity both influence coral reef ecosystem functioning and resilience. Higher coral species richness has been associated with improved ecosystem performance, including contributions to reef growth and structural development, although the strength of this relationship is non-linear, with benefits increasing rapidly at lower levels of diversity and then leveling off at higher levels. This pattern indicates that reefs with low diversity may experience larger declines in ecosystem functioning with additional species loss, while more diverse reefs may show smaller functional changes when species are lost. In addition to species richness, functional diversity, the range of ecological roles or traits represented by species, varies across coral reef regions and is not always directly correlated with the number of species present. A global analysis of reef-building corals found that some regions with high species richness exhibit relatively low functional diversity, indicating a degree of functional similarity among species.This variation in functional trait diversity suggests that reefs differ in the distribution of ecological functions they support, which may influence their responses to environmental change. Together, these findings indicate that both species diversity and the diversity of functional traits contribute to patterns of ecosystem functioning on coral reefs.

== Ecological impacts and recovery ==
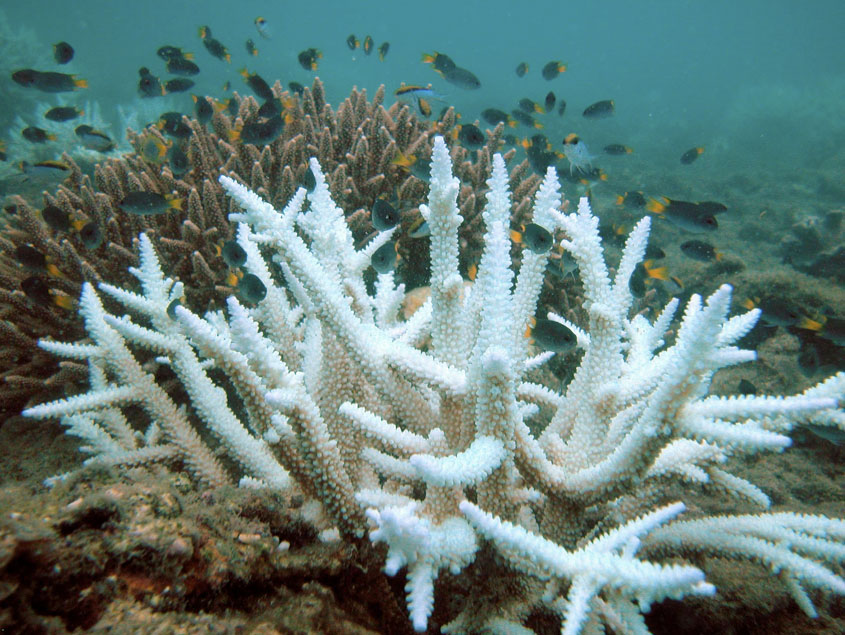
Corals "seeded" with thermally-resistant zooxanthellae may become more resilient and able to resist coral bleaching.

Research studies of the Mediterranean species of coral Oculina patagonica reveal that the presence of endolithic algae in coral skeletons may provide additional energy which can result in post-bleaching recovery. During bleaching, the loss of zooxanthellae decreases the amount of light absorbed by coral tissue, which allows increased amounts of photosynthetically active radiation to penetrate the coral skeleton. Greater amounts of photosynthetically active radiation in coral skeletons cause an increase in endolithic algae biomass and production of photoassimilates. During bleaching, the energy input to the coral tissue of phototrophic endoliths expand as the energy input of the zooxanthellae dwindles. This additional energy could explain the survival and rapid recovery of O. patagonica after bleaching events. A study by the Australian Research Council proposed that the loss of fast-growing coral could lead to less resilience of the remaining coral. The study was undertaken in both the Caribbean and the Indo-Pacific and reached the conclusion that the latter may be more resilient than the former based on several factors; the process of herbivory and the rates of algal blooms forming.

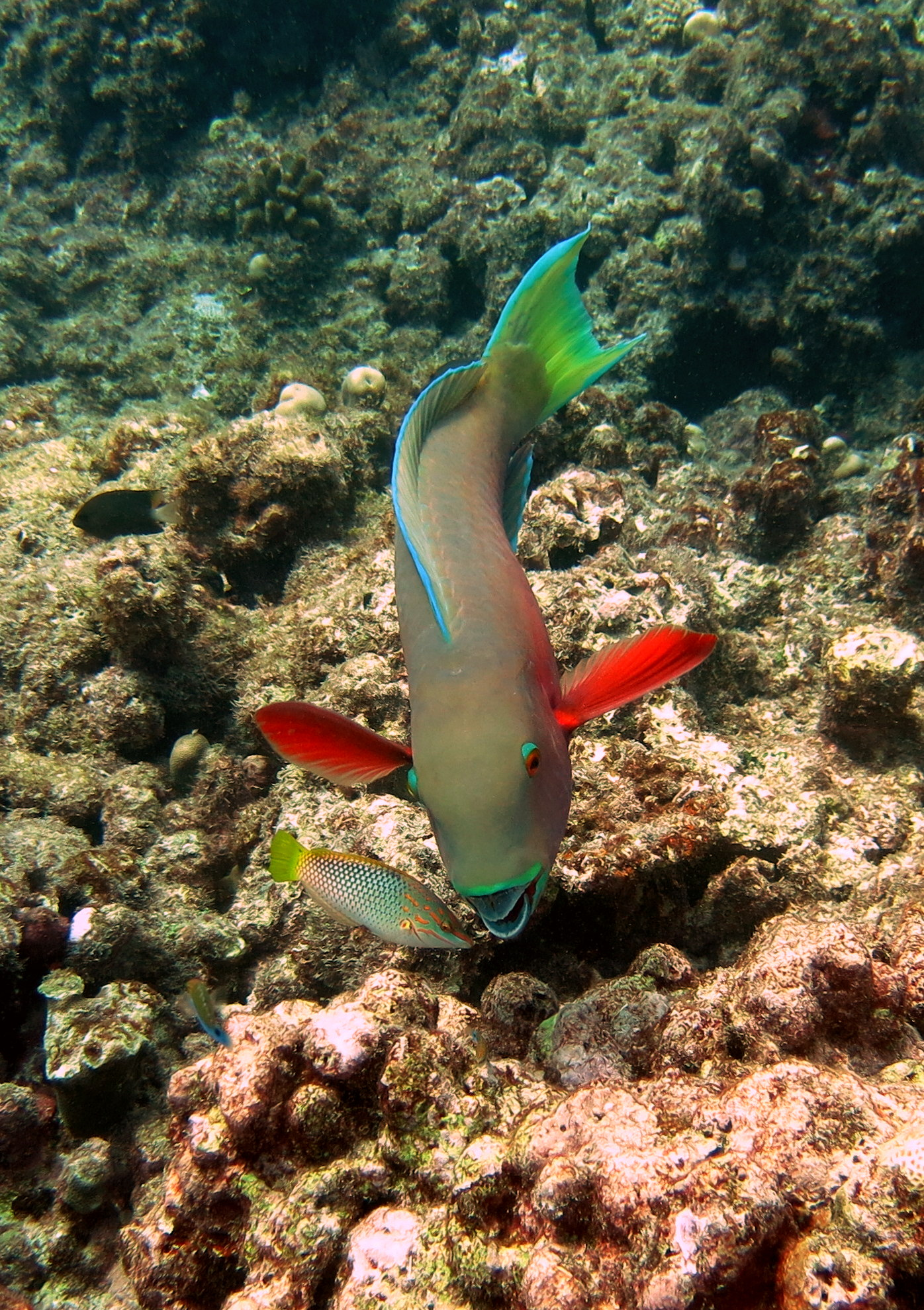
Parrotfish

Coral bleaching is a major consequence of stress on coral reefs. Bleaching events due to distinct temperature changes, pollution, and other shifts of environmental conditions are detrimental to coral health, but corals can restore from bleaching events if the stress is not chronic. When corals are exposed to a long period of severe stress, death may occur due to the loss of zooxanthellae, which are vital to the coral's survival because of the nutrients they supply. Coral bleaching, degradation, and death have a great effect on the surrounding ecosystem and biodiversity. Coral reefs are important, diverse ecosystems that host a plethora of organisms that contribute different services to maintain reef health. For example, herbivorous reef fish, like the parrotfish, maintain levels of macro algae. The upkeep of seaweed contributes to decreasing space competition for substrate-seeking organisms, like corals, to establish and propagate, creating a stronger, more resilient reef. However, when corals become bleached, organisms often leave the coral reef habitat which in turn takes away the services that they were previously supplying. Reefs also administer many ecosystem services such as food provision for many people around the world who are dependent on fishing reefs to sustain themselves. There is evidence that some species of coral are resilient to elevated sea surface temperatures for a short period of time.

== Disturbances and Stressors ==
=== Physiological Mechanisms of Coral Bleaching ===
Coral bleaching results when an environmental stress negatively affects the symbiotic relationship that exists between a coral's photosynthetic algae (Symbiodiniaceae) and itself. This causes either expulsion of the algae or loss of those same algae. In addition, warmer-than-normal sea-surface temperature levels reduce the photosynthetic efficiency of the symbiont's cells. As a result, damaged algae produce reactive oxygen species, which further damage the host cells.

To mitigate further damage to their cells, corals expel their symbionts. The expelled symbionts cause the colourless appearance of the white coral. The expulsion of symbionts greatly decreases the amount of energy available to the coral since 80-90% of all of a coral's energy needs come directly from photosynthesis. If stressful conditions continue for an extended period of time, then long-term energy deficiencies can lead to decreased growth rates, diminished reproductive capabilities, and eventually death. However, under certain circumstances, corals that have experienced severe bleaching due to environmental stressors can regrow and regain their symbionts, provided that the environmental factors causing the stress have been removed, and the coral's species has sufficient ability to withstand stress.

=== Natural disturbances ===
Natural forces such as disease, storms and tidal emersion degrade corals. The frequency of coral disease caused by microbial pathogens has increased over the years, contributing to coral reef mortality. Bacterial, fungal, viral, and parasitic infections can result in physiological and morphological effects. Some of the most common coral diseases include black band disease, white pox disease, white plague, and white band disease, all of which involve tissue degradation and exposure of the coral skeleton. Diseases such as these can quickly spread among healthy coral reefs, potentially making them more susceptible to injury from disturbances like storms. Storms, including cyclones and hurricanes, can cause mechanical destruction to reefs and a change in sedimentation. The strong waves that result from these disturbances can strike corals, causing them to dislodge, and can also cause the reef to come into contact with released sediments and freshwater. Tidal emersion, or low tides, can leave shallow reefs unprotected from UV radiation and heat, leading to stressed and dry corals that may expel its zooxanthellae if exposed for too long.

=== Anthropogenic disturbances ===
Anthropogenic forces contribute to coral reef degradation, reducing their resiliency. Some anthropogenic forces that degrade corals include pollution, sedimentation from coastal development, and ocean acidification due to increased fossil fuel emissions. Carbon emissions cause ocean surface waters to warm and acidify. The combustion of fossil fuels results in the emission of greenhouse gases, such as carbon dioxide into the atmosphere. The ocean uptakes some of the emitted carbon dioxide, injurious to the natural processes that occur in the ocean. Ocean acidification results in a lower ocean water pH, negatively affecting the formation of calcium carbonate structures which are imperative to coral development. Developing coastal areas has the potential for chemical and nutrient pollution to run off into surrounding waters. Nutrient pollution causes the overgrowth of aquatic vegetation which has the ability to out-compete corals for space, nutrients, and other resources. Occasionally, water runoff containing pathogens from human and livestock waste can also infect coral in large outbreaks and cause damage to reefs. Plastic pollution is another anthropogenic disturbance that affects coral reef resilience. Corals may recognize microplastics as food and ingest them, possibly making the corals feel full while their digestive system is actually congested. Microplastics can also land on the outside of corals, causing irritation to the coral and blocking them from accessing proper food. Larger plastic debris is also dangerous for corals, getting caught in the coral's structure and increasing the risk of disease due to pathogens that the plastic may carry.

Overfishing can also have devastating effects on coral reefs. Due to the food security that reefs hold, they are often overfished, which can cause reef ecosystems to be unable to reconstruct after damage has been done. Restoration can be challenging due to the direct harm that fishing activities can have on coral reefs through damage caused by fishing gear, including nets, lines, and traps. Additionally, noticeable changes in marine life, such as the loss of herbivorous fish that offer valuable services to coral reefs, can reduce ecosystem function as a whole. Another anthropogenic force that degrades coral reefs is bottom trawling; a fishing practice that scrapes coral reef habitats and other bottom substrate-dwelling organisms off the ocean floor. Bottom trawling results in physical wreckage and stress that leads to corals being broken and zooxanthellae expelled. Similar to bottom trawling, rock anchoring used for fishing can cause physical damage to these fragile reefs due to the heavy weight of the anchor, cables, and chains. If coral reefs are exposed to physical damage like rock anchoring regularly, it can result in less resiliency to ocean acidification.

Ecotourism is another anthropogenic factor that contributes to coral reef degradation. During ecotourism, humans can cause stress to the corals by accidentally touching, polluting, or breaking off parts of the reef, often resulting in coral bleaching as they attempt to fight off the intrusion. However, ecotourism is not only harmful when humans are close enough to touch the coral. Less direct impacts, such as harmful chemicals in sunscreen and sedimentation driven by the tourism industry, can have irreversible effects as well. The jewelry making and aquarium industries may also cause harm to coral reefs through overexploitation and overharvesting. This can lead to lower biodiversity in a reef and damage the surrounding corals that were not harvested.

== Managing coral reefs ==
In an attempt to prevent coral bleaching, scientists are experimenting by "seeding" corals that can host multiple types of zooxanthellae with thermally-resistant zooxanthellae. MPAs have begun to apply reef resilience management techniques in order to improve the 'immune system' of coral reefs and promote reef recovery after bleaching.

The Nature Conservancy has developed, and is continually refining, a model to help manage and promote reef resilience. Although this model does not guarantee reef resilience, it is a comprehensible management model to follow. The principles outlined in their model are:

- Effective management: Resilience based strategies are based on reducing threats to maintain healthy reefs. Measurements of effective management of MPAs allows for adaptive management.
- Representation and replication: Coral survivorship is ensured by representing and replicating resilient species and habitats in an MPA network. The presence of resilient species in management in MPAs will help protect corals from bleaching events and other natural disturbances.
- Critical areas: Conservation priority areas provide protection to critical marine areas, such as sources of larvae for coral reef regeneration or nursery habitats for fish spawning.
- Connectivity: Preserving the connectivity between coral reefs and surrounding habitats provides healthy coral communities and fish habitat.
- Socioeconomic criteria: Taking into consideration social factors, such as cultural and recreational activity, and economic factors, such as fishing and tourism, in the management of MPAs.

Scientists have also developed a new technique by Smithsonian's National Zoo and Conservation Biology Institute and funded by a conservation organization called Revive and Restore. This technique is referred to as cryopreservation and involves freezing and thawing entire fragments of coral, resulting in slowing the loss of coral species and restoring damaged reefs. Previous coral cryopreservation techniques relied on largely freezing sperm and larvae, making collection difficult, as spawning events only occur a few days a year. This previous technique was also difficult because frequent marine heatwaves and warm waters can cause corals to be biologically stressed, resulting in their reproductive material being too weak to be frozen or thawed. The new technique is easier and works more rapidly, as it allows researchers and preservations to work throughout the year, rather than waiting for a certain species to spawn and put stress on coral's reproductive materials.

Scientists have also looked deeper into energy reserves and coral feeding. Feeding on zooplankton, brine shrimp, and algae may serve as a buffer for the harsh effects of climate change. Feeding corals can help them sustain tissue biomass and energy reserves and enhance nitrogen content, allowing for a higher zooxanthellae concentration and increased photosynthesis. Increased feeding rates can also allow certain species of bleached and recovering coral to exceed their daily metabolic energy requirements. These results suggest that coral species with a high CHAR (percent contribution of heterotrophically acquired carbon to daily animal respiration) capability may be more resilient to bleaching events, becoming the dominant species, and helping to safeguard affected reefs from extinction.

=== Advances in resilience prediction ===
One recent scientific discovery has recognized a molecular biomarkers that can help predict coral resilience to thermal stress conditions. In a 2025 study published in "Nature Communications", authors established that specific protein expression patterns within corals were connected with their ability to survive in heatwave conditions. Through analysis of these protein signatures, the researchers were able to identify and prioritize heat-tolerant coral species and populations with the goal of conversation and restoration in mind. This method provides a tool to enhance the coral reef resiliency and improve management strategies under present-day ongoing climate change issues.

Experimental work is being done using artificial structures to increase coral resilience. One method is planting 3D printed models of coral into reefs to encourage biodiversity of reef organisms and allow polyps to attach and grow. These 3D printed coral structures have been shown to not affect the natural behaviors of the reef organisms or change growth and mortality patterns, allowing for normal functioning of the reef community. Another method is creating and planting entire reef structures, using a variety of materials including 3D printing or molding calcium carbonate structures, molded concrete, large sunken ships, and more. These artificial reef structures provide shelter and habitable areas for young coral polyps to grow and promote recovery of previously bleached corals.

== Further references ==
- Oliver, Thomas Andrew (2009) The role of coral's algal symbionts in coral reef adaptation to climate change ProQuest. ISBN 978-0-549-98995-0.
