= Ecology and Society =

- Discipline: Social-ecological systems, resilience, sustainability science
- Language: English
- Edited by: Patricia Balvanera, Craig R. Allen, Katrina Brown

Publication details
- Former name: Conservation Ecology
- History: 1997–present
- Publisher: Resilience Alliance
- Frequency: Quarterly
- Open access: Yes
- License: CC BY 4.0

Standard abbreviations
- ISO 4: Ecol. Soc.

Indexing
- ISSN: 1708-3087
- OCLC no.: 818984142

Links
- Journal homepage

Ecology and Society (abbreviated Ecol. Soc.) is a peer-reviewed, open access, society-run, non-profit scientific journal covering research on the relationships between people and ecosystems. It publishes interdisciplinary work at the interface of ecology, the social sciences and sustainability studies, and is known for contributions on social-ecological systems, resilience, and sustainability transitions. The journal is published by the scientific network the Resilience Alliance.

== History ==
The journal was established in 1997 under the title Conservation Ecology and was renamed Ecology and Society in 1999 to reflect a broader interdisciplinary scope. The founding editor-in-chief was C. S. Holling, a pioneer of resilience theory. Past editors-in-chief include Carl Folke, Lance Gunderson, and Marco Janssen. As of 2025, the editors-in-chief are Patricia Balvanera (National Autonomous University of Mexico), Craig R. Allen (University of Nebraska–Lincoln), and Katrina Brown (University of Exeter).

== Scope ==
Ecology and Society publishes theoretical, empirical, and synthesis research on interactions between social and ecological systems. Topics include adaptive governance, ecosystem services, transformation in the Anthropocene, and the co-production of knowledge for sustainability.

Under its current editorial leadership, the journal aims to broaden participation across disciplines and regions, encourage collaboration between scientists and practitioners, and support early-career authors. It also promotes diverse article types, including research, insight, and synthesis papers.

The journal describes its scope as: "Content of the journal includes applied, theoretical, experimental, and experiential contributions. Papers should cover topics relating to the ecological, political, and social dimensions of social-ecological systems. Specifically, the journal publishes articles that present research findings on the following issues: (a) the current status of the complex interactions between nature and society, (b) the biophysical, social, and political drivers of the (un)sustainable dynamics of social-ecological systems as well as those that foster (or prevent) their resilience, (c) the means by which we can develop and sustain desired future pathways".

== Open access and governance ==
The journal operates under a full open-access model with all content licensed under CC BY 4.0. Authors retain copyright to their work. Ecology and Society is a scientist-run, non-profit publication managed by the Resilience Alliance, a cooperative of researchers and institutions dedicated to advancing social-ecological systems science.

== Abstracting and indexing ==
The journal is abstracted and indexed in Web of Science, Scopus, Geobase, and AGRIS.

According to Scopus it had an Cite Score of 6.5 in 2024, and is a Q1 journal Ecology.

== Notable articles ==
As of October 2025 some of the most cited articles in the journal were:

- Walker, B. H.; Holling, C. S.; Carpenter, S. R.; Kinzig, A. (2004). "Resilience, adaptability and transformability in social-ecological systems". Ecology and Society. 9 (2): 5.
- Cash, D. W., W. Adger, F. Berkes, P. Garden, L. Lebel, P. Olsson, L. Pritchard, and O. Young. 2006. Scale and cross-scale dynamics: governance and information in a multilevel world. Ecology and Society 11(2): 8
- McGinnis, M.D., and E. Ostrom. 2014. Social-ecological system framework: initial changes and continuing challenges. Ecology and Society 19(2): 30.
- Anderies, J.M., M.A. Janssen, and E. Ostrom. 2004. A framework to analyze the robustness of social-ecological systems from an institutional perspective. Ecology and Society 9(1): 18.
- Rodríguez, J.P., T.D. Beard Jr., E.M. Bennett, G.S. Cumming, S. Cork, J. Agard, A.P. Dobson, and G.D. Peterson. 2006. Trade-offs across space, time, and ecosystem services. Ecology and Society 11(1): 28.
- Kabisch, N., N. Frantzeskaki, S. Pauleit, S. Naumann, M. Davis, M. Artmann, D. Haase, S. Knapp, H. Korn, J. Stadler, K. Zaunberger, and A. Bonn. 2016. Nature-based solutions to climate change mitigation and adaptation in urban areas: perspectives on indicators, knowledge gaps, barriers, and opportunities for action. Ecology and Society 21(2):39.

== See also ==
- List of environmental social science journals
- Social-ecological system
- Resilience (ecology)
- Sustainability science
