= Supply chain resilience =

Persisting, adapting or transforming a supply chain

Supply chain resilience is "the capacity of a supply chain to persist, adapt, or transform in the face of change". It is a popular concept within contemporary supply chain management.

== Origins ==
Around the turn of the millennium, supply chain risk management practitioners attempted to transfer traditional risk management approaches from the "company" system to the "supply chain" system. However, the scalability of traditional risk management steps (identification, assessment, treatment and monitoring of risks) quickly reaches its limits: while it is entirely possible to identify all conceivable risks within a company; a supply chain often consists of thousands of companies – the attempt to identify all possible risks in this system is therefore much more complex, if not impossible. It has therefore been argued that the complexity of supply chains requires complementary measures such as supply chain resilience. Resilience is the ability to cope with all sorts of change, and is thus less about the identification of specific risks but more about the characteristics of the system.

== Interpretations ==
=== Engineering resilience ===
For a long time, the interpretation of resilience in the sense of engineering resilience prevailed in supply chain management. It is implied here that supply chain is a closed system that can be controlled, similar to a system designed and planned by engineers (e.g. subway network). According to C. S. Holling (1996), engineering resilience focuses on stability near an equilibrium steady state, where resistance to disturbance and the speed of return to equilibrium are used as measures of resilience. The expectations placed on managers come close to those placed on engineers, who should react quickly in the event of a disturbance in order to restore the system's ideal and original state as quickly as possible. A popular implementation of this idea in supply chain management is given by measuring the time-to-survive and the time-to-recover of the supply chain, allowing to identify weak points in the system. Acting like an engineer by redesigning the supply chain like on the drawing board, often by creating redundancies (e.g. multiple sourcing), strengthens resilience. In the short term, a supply chain can be viewed as a relatively rigid system. The idea of persistence of a supply chain that follows from engineering resilience therefore makes sense in the short term. However, this approach has mid to long-term limits.

=== Socio-ecological resilience ===
Social-ecological resilience goes back to ecological resilience, adding to it human decision-makers and their social interactions. A supply chain is thus interpreted as a social-ecological system that – similar to an ecosystem (e.g. forest) – is able to constantly adapt to external environmental conditions. In this framework, the supply chain is not interpreted as a system that needs to be stabilized in a fixed state (focus: persistence), but as a fluid system or even as a fluid process that interacts with the rest of the world (focus: adaptation or even transformation).

== Examples of disruption and response ==
Recent studies and data have examined how European Union firms responded to significant supply chain disruptions caused by the COVID-19 pandemic, maritime transport issues, and geopolitical conflicts. These events exposed the vulnerabilities of EU supply chains, particularly their reliance on foreign imports. For example, in 2023 44% of EU firms who imported from China experienced transport and logistics challenges, while only 22% of the firms that imported solely within the EU reported similar numbers.

In response to challenges like these, trade patterns have shifted. The share of EU exports directed to the US increased to 21% in 2023, compared to a 14% in 2010. This is in order to mitigate risk and enhance supply chain resilience.

A UN General Assembly Foreign Ministers' dialogue in 2026 raised concerns about the disruptive impact of weather extremes "including record July sea surface temperatures, the warmest July on record for North America, Africa and Asia, and sustained heatwaves in Europe" on supply chains and agricultural production, promising to revisit these issues in future foreign minister meetings.

== Strategies for Building Supply chain Resilience ==
The engineering and socio-ecological interpretations of resilience differ in emphasis, but organizations usually draw on both in practice: some measures help a supply chain absorb a shock and recover from it, while others help it adapt to lasting change Ponomarov and Holcomb describe supply chain resilience as the adaptive capability to prepare for unexpected events, respond to disruptions and recover from them while maintaining continuity of operations Building that capability involves more than identifying risks. It also depends on decisions about sourcing, transportation, inventory, information sharing and the flexibility of day-to-day operations. A systematic review of 91 studies found that research has concentrated on four main strategies: increasing flexibility, creating redundancy, developing collaborative relationships and improving agility.

Interest in these strategies grew after the COVID-19 pandemic and the shipping disruptions that followed. A 2020 analysis by the McKinsey Global Institute estimated that companies could expect a supply chain disruption lasting a month or longer every 3.7 years on average, and that such disruptions could cost them more than 40 percent of one year's profits over a decade. In a 2024 survey of supply chain leaders, nine in ten respondents reported encountering supply chain challenges that year.^{[5]}

== Supplier diversification and operational flexibility ==
Relying on a single supplier, or on suppliers concentrated in one location, can leave an organization exposed when supply is interrupted. Common responses include dual or multiple sourcing, qualifying alternative suppliers in advance, and regionalizing or nearshoring parts of the supply base. In McKinsey's 2024 survey, 73 percent of respondents reported progress on dual-sourcing strategies and 60 percent were taking steps to regionalize their supply chains, although the share pursuing these strategies had remained flat over the previous two years.

Flexibility in production and transportation offers a further source of resilience. Sheffi and Rice argued that firms can become resilient either by building redundancy, such as spare capacity and safety stock, or by building flexibility, such as interchangeable processes, standardized components and multi-skilled workers, and that flexibility often brings benefits under normal conditions as well.Later modelling showed that process flexibility, combined with inventory, can increase supply chain robustness. Maintaining alternative suppliers and additional capacity can, however, increase costs, so organizations need to weigh those costs against the expected benefits of greater resilience.

At the level of national economies, the Organisation for Economic Co-operation and Development (OECD) reported in 2025 that most trade flows remained relatively diversified, but that import concentration was rising as countries sourced products from fewer partners. Its modelling suggested that policies to relocalize supply chains within national borders could reduce global trade by more than 18 percent and global real GDP by more than 5 percent, without consistently improving resilience to disruptions.

== Information sharing and collaboration ==
Supply chains involve many organizations, and a disruption at one of them can spread to others, a phenomenon sometimes called the ripple effect. Sharing timely information among suppliers, manufacturers, logistics providers and customers helps partners recognize emerging problems and coordinate their responses. Early communication about shortages or delivery delays, for example, can give downstream firms time to arrange alternatives before a disruption spreads further. Christopher and Peck identified collaboration and supply chain visibility as central elements of a resilient supply chain, and collaborative relationships are among the strategies most frequently discussed in the research literature.

The OECD has also emphasized cooperation at the policy level, arguing that the key to resilience lies not in eliminating risk but in navigating it effectively through public, private and international cooperation with trusted partners.

== Preparedness, response and recovery ==
Supply chain resilience is not limited to what happens during a disruption; it also covers the actions taken before and after an unexpected event. Some researchers distinguish resilience as a reactive process of recovery from resilience as a proactive capability built in advance. Others describe three capacities: absorptive capacity, which limits the initial impact; adaptive capacity, which allows the supply chain to adjust during the disruption; and restorative capacity, which supports recovery

Preparedness includes mapping vulnerabilities, assessing critical suppliers and routes, and developing contingency plans. Response may involve changing suppliers, adjusting production schedules or using alternative transport routes. The Red Sea crisis that began in late 2023 illustrates this stage: after attacks on commercial vessels, many carriers rerouted ships around the Cape of Good Hope. UNCTAD estimated that Suez Canal transits had fallen 42 percent from their peak by early 2024, and that weekly container ship transits were down 67 percent year on year. By mid-2024, rerouting away from the Red Sea and the drought-affected Panama Canal had raised global container ship demand by 12 percent compared with what it would otherwise have been.

Recovery involves restoring affected activities and considering whether structural changes are needed to reduce vulnerability to future disruptions. Drawing on the COVID-19 experience, Ivanov proposed the concept of the viable supply chain, in which resilience is combined with agility and sustainability so that a supply chain can redesign its structures and survive long-term crises, not only return to its previous state

== Balancing efficiency and resilience ==
Organizations often seek to reduce costs by keeping inventories low, limiting the number of suppliers and running lean or just-in-time operations. These practices can improve performance under normal conditions, but they may leave fewer alternatives when disruptions occur. Maintaining additional inventory, alternative suppliers or spare capacity, on the other hand, raises operating costs. Supply chain resilience therefore involves finding an appropriate balance between efficiency and the resources needed to manage unexpected events

Recent evidence suggests that firms are still adjusting this balance. McKinsey's 2024 survey found that inventory buffers were no longer the preferred way to mitigate supply chain risk and that respondents were evenly divided on their future inventory strategy. The wider costs of disruption can also be significant: UNCTAD estimated that if the increase in container freight rates caused by the Red Sea and Panama Canal disruptions persisted until the end of 2025, global consumer prices could rise by 0.6 percent.

== See also ==
- Niko Paech

== Literature ==
- Sheffi, Yosef (2007). The resilient enterprise: overcoming vulnerability for competitive advantage: [with a new preface for the paperback edition] (1. MIT paperback ed.). Cambridge, Mass. London: MIT Press. ISBN 978-0262693493.
- Walker, Brian H. (2020). "Resilience: what it is and is not". Ecology and Society. 25 (2) art11. Bibcode:2020EcSoc..25Tr.11W. doi:10.5751/ES-11647-250211.
- Wieland, Andreas; Durach, Christian F. (July 2021). "Two perspectives on supply chain resilience". Journal of Business Logistics. 42 (3): 315–322. doi:10.1111/jbl.12271. hdl:10398/0a703fa5-c14c-4c2a-b427-9640a30b6c09.
- Paravano, Alessandro; Locatelli, Giorgio; Trucco, Paolo (2025). "Drivers and Barriers in Shaping Resilience Projects: an Investigation in the Space Economy". IEEE Transactions on Engineering Management. 72: 2783–2797. Bibcode:2025ITEM...72.2783P. doi:10.1109/TEM.2025.3568298. hdl:11311/1297756.
