= William C. Clark =

- Born: December 20, 1948 (age 76); Greenwich, Connecticut
- Education: University of British Columbia
- Awards: MacArthur Fellows
- Scientific career
- Fields: Sustainability Science
- Institutions: Harvard University
- Thesis: Spatial structure and population dynamics in an insect epidemic ecosystem (1979)
- Doctoral advisor: C. S. Holling

William Cummin Clark is the Harvey Brooks Professor of International Science, Public Policy and Human Development at the John F. Kennedy School of Government, Harvard University.

William Clark known for his long-term efforts to promote sustainability science. He co-chaired the US National Research Council report on Sustainability ‘Our Common Journey,” and in 2016 co-authored a textbook on Sustainability Science. He is also established and is now co-editor of its sustainability science section of the scientific journal Proceedings of the National Academy of Sciences. He co-leads the Sustainability Science Program at Harvard , and he is also on the board of directors of the Julie Ann Wrigley Global Institute of Sustainability at Arizona State University.

== Awards ==
Clark is a member of the USA’s National Academy of Sciences and a Fellow of the American Association for the Advancement of Science. He received a MacArthur Fellowship in 1983. He received an honorary doctorate from Leuphana University in 2012 for his work on sustainability science.

== Education ==
He earned a BSc from Yale in 1971 and a PhD in Ecology from University of British Columbia in 1979.
