= Ecological resilience =

Capacity of ecosystems to resist and recover from change

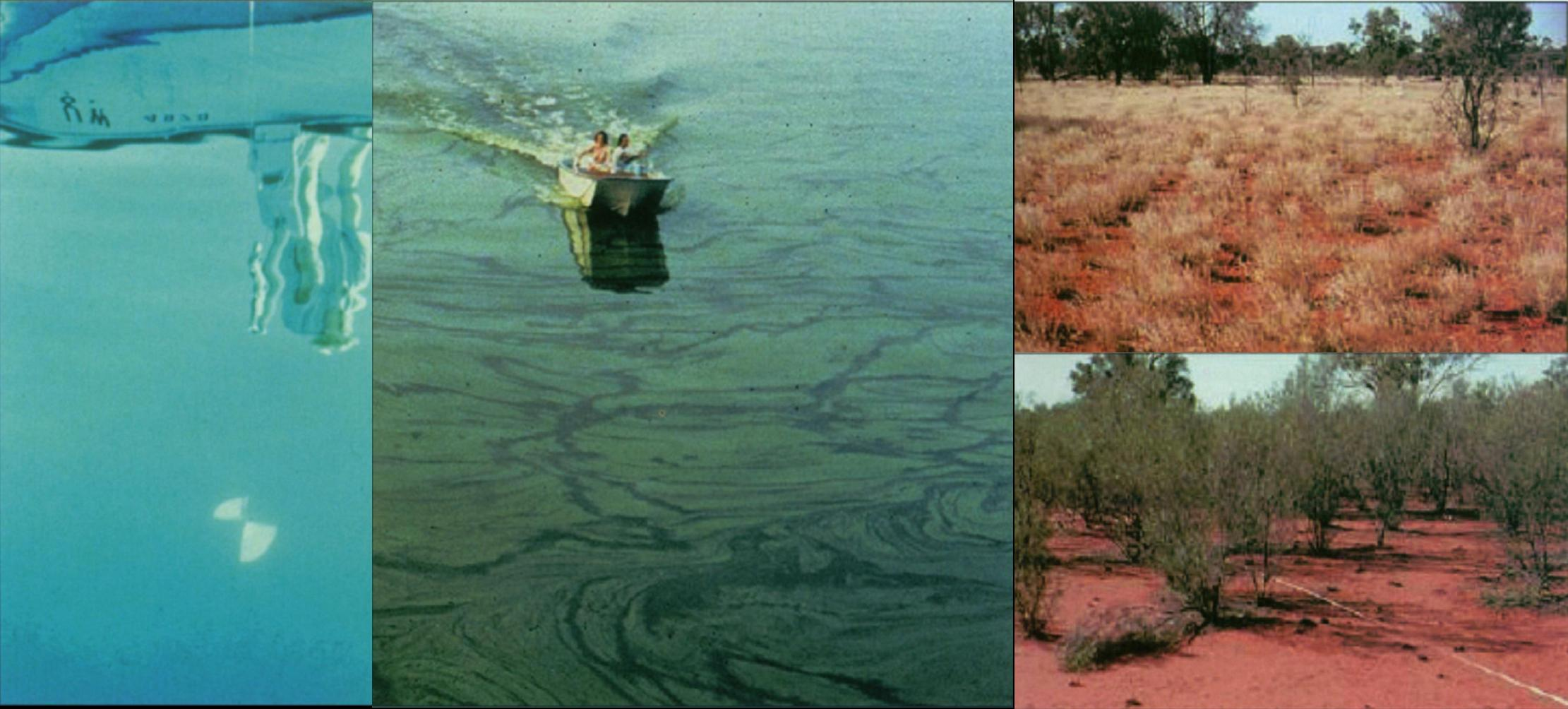
Lake and Mulga ecosystems with alternative stable states

In ecology, resilience is the capacity of an ecosystem to respond to a perturbation or disturbance by resisting damage and subsequently recovering. Such perturbations and disturbances can include stochastic events such as fires, flooding, windstorms, insect population explosions, and human activities such as deforestation, fracking of the ground for oil extraction, pesticide sprayed in soil, and the introduction of exotic plant or animal species. Disturbances of sufficient magnitude or duration can profoundly affect an ecosystem and may force an ecosystem to reach a threshold beyond which a different regime of processes and structures predominates. When such thresholds are associated with a critical or bifurcation point, these regime shifts may also be referred to as critical transitions.

Human activities that adversely affect ecological resilience such as reduction of biodiversity, exploitation of natural resources, pollution, land use, and anthropogenic climate change are increasingly causing regime shifts in ecosystems, often to less desirable and degraded conditions. Interdisciplinary discourse on resilience now includes consideration of the interactions of humans and ecosystems via socio-ecological systems, and the need for shift from the maximum sustainable yield paradigm to environmental resource management and ecosystem management, which aim to build ecological resilience through "resilience analysis, adaptive resource management, and adaptive governance". Ecological resilience has inspired other fields and continues to challenge the way they interpret resilience, e.g. supply chain resilience.

== Definitions ==
The IPCC Sixth Assessment Report defines resilience as, “not just the ability to maintain essential function, identity and structure, but also the capacity for transformation.” The IPCC considers resilience both in terms of ecosystem recovery as well as the recovery and adaptation of human societies to natural disasters.

The concept of resilience in ecological systems was first introduced by the Canadian ecologist C.S. Holling in order to describe the persistence of natural systems in the face of changes in ecosystem variables due to natural or anthropogenic causes. Resilience has been defined in two ways in ecological literature:

1. as the time required for an ecosystem to return to an equilibrium or steady-state following a perturbation (which is also defined as stability by some authors). This definition of resilience is used in other fields such as physics and engineering, and hence has been termed ‘engineering resilience’ by Holling.
2. as "the capacity of a system to absorb disturbance and reorganize while undergoing change so as to still retain essentially the same function, structure, identity, and feedbacks".

The second definition has been termed ‘ecological resilience’, and it presumes the existence of multiple stable states or regimes.

For example, some shallow temperate lakes can exist within either clear water regime, which provides many ecosystem services, or a turbid water regime, which provides reduced ecosystem services and can produce toxic algae blooms. The regime or state is dependent upon lake phosphorus cycles, and either regime can be resilient dependent upon the lake's ecology and management.

Likewise, Mulga woodlands of Australia can exist in a grass-rich regime that supports sheep herding, or a shrub-dominated regime of no value for sheep grazing. Regime shifts are driven by the interaction of fire, herbivory, and variable rainfall. Either state can be resilient dependent upon management.

== Theory ==
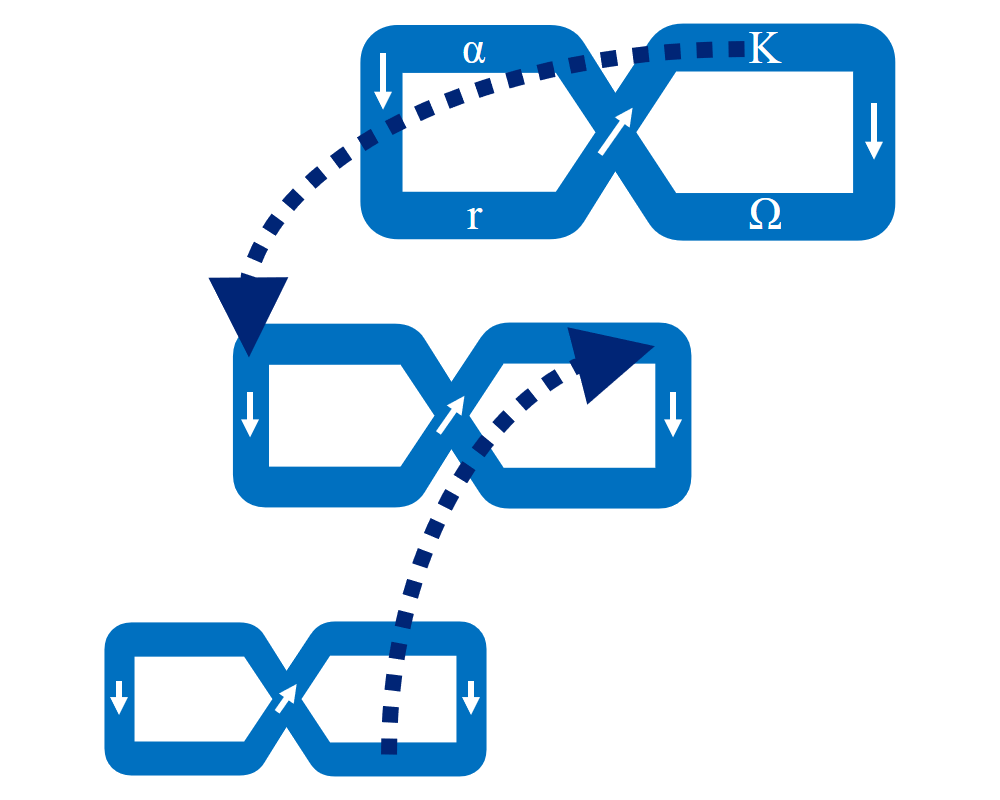
Three levels of a panarchy, three adaptive cycles, and two cross-level linkages (remember and revolt)

Ecologists Brian Walker, C S Holling and others describe four critical aspects of resilience: latitude, resistance, precariousness, and panarchy.

The first three can apply both to a whole system or the sub-systems that make it up.

1. Latitude: the maximum amount a system can be changed before losing its ability to recover (before crossing a threshold which, if breached, makes recovery difficult or impossible).
2. Resistance: the ease or difficulty of changing the system; how “resistant” it is to being changed.
3. Precariousness: how close the current state of the system is to a limit or “threshold.”.
4. Panarchy: the degree to which a certain hierarchical level of an ecosystem is influenced by other levels. For example, organisms living in communities that are in isolation from one another may be organized differently from the same type of organism living in a large continuous population, thus the community-level structure is influenced by population-level interactions.

Closely linked to resilience is adaptive capacity, which is the property of an ecosystem that describes change in stability landscapes and resilience. Adaptive capacity in socio-ecological systems refers to the ability of humans to deal with change in their environment by observation, learning and altering their interactions.

== Human impacts ==
Resilience refers to ecosystem's stability and capability of tolerating disturbance and restoring itself. If the disturbance is of sufficient magnitude or duration, a threshold may be reached where the ecosystem undergoes a regime shift, possibly permanently. Sustainable use of environmental goods and services requires understanding and consideration of the resilience of the ecosystem and its limits. However, the elements which influence ecosystem resilience are complicated. For example, various elements such as the water cycle, fertility, biodiversity, plant diversity and climate, interact fiercely and affect different systems.

There are many areas where human activity impacts upon and is also dependent upon the resilience of terrestrial, aquatic and marine ecosystems. These include agriculture, deforestation, pollution, mining, recreation, overfishing, dumping of waste into the sea and climate change.

=== Agriculture ===
Agriculture can be used as a significant case study in which the resilience of terrestrial ecosystems should be considered. The organic matter (elements carbon and nitrogen) in soil, which is supposed to be recharged by multiple plants, is the main source of nutrients for crop growth. In response to global food demand and shortages, however, intensive agriculture practices including the application of herbicides to control weeds, fertilisers to accelerate and increase crop growth and pesticides to control insects, reduce plant biodiversity while the supply of organic matter to replenish soil nutrients and prevent surface runoff is diminished. This leads to a reduction in soil fertility and productivity. More sustainable agricultural practices would take into account and estimate the resilience of the land and monitor and balance the input and output of organic matter.

=== Deforestation ===
The term deforestation has a meaning that covers crossing the threshold of forest's resilience and losing its ability to return to its originally stable state. To recover itself, a forest ecosystem needs suitable interactions among climate conditions and bio-actions, and enough area. In addition, generally, the resilience of a forest system allows recovery from a relatively small scale of damage (such as lightning or landslide) of up to 10 percent of its area. The larger the scale of damage, the more difficult it is for the forest ecosystem to restore and maintain its balance.

Deforestation also decreases biodiversity of both plant and animal life and can lead to an alteration of the climatic conditions of an entire area. According to the IPCC Sixth Assessment Report, carbon emissions due to land use and land use changes predominantly come from deforestation, thereby increasing the long-term exposure of forest ecosystems to drought and other climate change-induced damages. Deforestation can also lead to species extinction, which can have a domino effect particularly when keystone species are removed or when a significant number of species is removed and their ecological function is lost.

=== Climate change ===
Climate resilience is a concept to describe how well people or ecosystems are prepared to bounce back from certain climate hazard events. The formal definition of the term is the "capacity of social, economic and ecosystems to cope with a hazardous event or trend or disturbance". For example, climate resilience can be the ability to recover from climate-related shocks such as floods and droughts. Different actions can increase climate resilience of communities and ecosystems to help them cope. They can help to keep systems working in the face of external forces. For example, building a seawall to protect a coastal community from flooding might help maintain existing ways of life there.

=== Overfishing ===
It has been estimated by the United Nations Food and Agriculture Organisation that over 70% of the world's fish stocks are either fully exploited or depleted which means overfishing threatens marine ecosystem resilience and this is mostly by rapid growth of fishing technology. One of the negative effects on marine ecosystems is that over the last half-century the stocks of coastal fish have had a huge reduction as a result of overfishing for its economic benefits. Blue fin tuna is at particular risk of extinction. Depletion of fish stocks results in lowered biodiversity and consequently imbalance in the food chain, and increased vulnerability to disease.

In addition to overfishing, coastal communities are suffering the impacts of growing numbers of large commercial fishing vessels in causing reductions of small local fishing fleets. Many local lowland rivers which are sources of fresh water have become degraded because of the inflows of pollutants and sediments.

=== Dumping of waste into the sea ===
Dumping both depends upon ecosystem resilience whilst threatening it. Dumping of sewage and other contaminants into the ocean is often undertaken for the dispersive nature of the oceans and adaptive nature and ability for marine life to process the marine debris and contaminants. However, waste dumping threatens marine ecosystems by poisoning marine life and eutrophication.

==== Poisoning marine life ====
According to the International Maritime Organisation oil spills can have serious effects on marine life. The OILPOL Convention recognized that most oil pollution resulted from routine shipboard operations such as the cleaning of cargo tanks. In the 1950s, the normal practice was simply to wash the tanks out with water and then pump the resulting mixture of oil and water into the sea. OILPOL 54 prohibited the dumping of oily wastes within a certain distance from land and in 'special areas' where the danger to the environment was especially acute. In 1962 the limits were extended by means of an amendment adopted at a conference organized by IMO. Meanwhile, IMO in 1965 set up a Subcommittee on Oil Pollution, under the auspices of its Maritime Safety committee, to address oil pollution issues.

The threat of oil spills to marine life is recognised by those likely to be responsible for the pollution, such as the International Tanker Owners Pollution Federation:

The marine ecosystem is highly complex and natural fluctuations in species composition, abundance and distribution are a basic feature of its normal function. The extent of damage can therefore be difficult to detect against this background variability. Nevertheless, the key to understanding damage and its importance is whether spill effects result in a downturn in breeding success, productivity, diversity and the overall functioning of the system. Spills are not the only pressure on marine habitats; chronic urban and industrial contamination or the exploitation of the resources they provide are also serious threats.

==== Eutrophication and algal blooms ====
The Woods Hole Oceanographic Institution calls nutrient pollution the most widespread, chronic environmental problem in the coastal ocean. The discharges of nitrogen, phosphorus, and other nutrients come from agriculture, waste disposal, coastal development, and fossil fuel use. Once nutrient pollution reaches the coastal zone, it stimulates harmful overgrowths of algae, which can have direct toxic effects and ultimately result in low-oxygen conditions. Certain types of algae are toxic. Overgrowths of these algae result in harmful algal blooms, which are more colloquially referred to as "red tides" or "brown tides". Zooplankton eat the toxic algae and begin passing the toxins up the food chain, affecting edibles like clams, and ultimately working their way up to seabirds, marine mammals, and humans. The result can be illness and sometimes death.

== Sustainable development ==
There is increasing awareness that a greater understanding and emphasis of ecosystem resilience is required to reach the goal of sustainable development. A similar conclusion is drawn by Perman et al. who use resilience to describe one of 6 concepts of sustainability; "A sustainable state is one which satisfies minimum conditions for ecosystem resilience through time". Resilience science has been evolving over the past decade, expanding beyond ecology to reflect systems of thinking in fields such as economics and political science. And, as more and more people move into densely populated cities, using massive amounts of water, energy, and other resources, the need to combine these disciplines to consider the resilience of urban ecosystems and cities is of paramount importance.

=== Academic perspectives ===
The interdependence of ecological and social systems has gained renewed recognition since the late 1990s by academics including Berkes and Folke and developed further in 2002 by Folke et al. As the concept of sustainable development has evolved beyond the 3 pillars of sustainable development to place greater political emphasis on economic development. This is a movement which causes wide concern in environmental and social forums and which Clive Hamilton describes as "the growth fetish".

The purpose of ecological resilience that is proposed is ultimately about averting our extinction as Walker cites Holling in his paper: "[..] "resilience is concerned with [measuring] the probabilities of extinction” (1973, p. 20)". Becoming more apparent in academic writing is the significance of the environment and resilience in sustainable development. Folke et al state that the likelihood of sustaining development is raised by "Managing for resilience" whilst Perman et al. propose that safeguarding the environment to "deliver a set of services" should be a "necessary condition for an economy to be sustainable". The growing application of resilience to sustainable development has produced a diversity of approaches and scholarly debates.

=== The flaw of the free market ===
The challenge of applying the concept of ecological resilience to the context of sustainable development is that it sits at odds with conventional economic ideology and policy making. Resilience questions the free market model within which global markets operate. Inherent to the successful operation of a free market is specialisation which is required to achieve efficiency and increase productivity. This very act of specialisation weakens resilience by permitting systems to become accustomed to and dependent upon their prevailing conditions. In the event of unanticipated shocks; this dependency reduces the ability of the system to adapt to these changes. Correspondingly; Perman et al. note that; "Some economic activities appear to reduce resilience, so that the level of disturbance to which the ecosystem can be subjected to without parametric change taking place is reduced".

=== Moving beyond sustainable development ===
Berkes and Folke table a set of principles to assist with "building resilience and sustainability" which consolidate approaches of adaptive management, local knowledge-based management practices and conditions for institutional learning and self-organisation.

More recently, it has been suggested by Andrea Ross that the concept of sustainable development is no longer adequate in assisting policy development fit for today's global challenges and objectives. This is because the concept of sustainable development is "based on weak sustainability" which doesn't take account of the reality of "limits to earth's resilience". Ross draws on the impact of climate change on the global agenda as a fundamental factor in the "shift towards ecological sustainability" as an alternative approach to that of sustainable development.

Because climate change is a major and growing driver of biodiversity loss, and that biodiversity and ecosystem functions and services, significantly contribute to climate change adaptation, mitigation and disaster risk reduction, proponents of ecosystem-based adaptation suggest that the resilience of vulnerable human populations and the ecosystem services upon which they depend are critical factors for sustainable development in a changing climate.

== In environmental policy ==
Scientific research associated with resilience is beginning to play a role in influencing policy-making and subsequent environmental decision making.

This occurs in a number of ways:

- Observed resilience within specific ecosystems drives management practice. When resilience is observed to be low, or impact seems to be reaching the threshold, management response can be to alter human behavior to result in less adverse impact to the ecosystem.
- Ecosystem resilience impacts upon the way that development is permitted/environmental decision making is undertaken, similar to the way that existing ecosystem health impacts upon what development is permitted. For instance, remnant vegetation in the states of Queensland and New South Wales are classified in terms of ecosystem health and abundance. Any impact that development has upon threatened ecosystems must consider the health and resilience of these ecosystems. This is governed by the Threatened Species Conservation Act 1995 in New South Wales and the Vegetation Management Act 1999 in Queensland.
- International level initiatives aim at improving socio-ecological resilience worldwide through the cooperation and contributions of scientific and other experts. An example of such an initiative is the Millennium Ecosystem Assessment whose objective is "to assess the consequences of ecosystem change for human well-being and the scientific basis for action needed to enhance the conservation and sustainable use of those systems and their contribution to human well-being". Similarly, the United Nations Environment Programme aim is "to provide leadership and encourage partnership in caring for the environment by inspiring, informing, and enabling nations and peoples to improve their quality of life without compromising that of future generations.

== Environmental management in legislation ==
Ecological resilience and the thresholds by which resilience is defined are closely interrelated in the way that they influence environmental policy-making, legislation and subsequently environmental management. The ability of ecosystems to recover from certain levels of environmental impact is not explicitly noted in legislation, however, because of ecosystem resilience, some levels of environmental impact associated with development are made permissible by environmental policy-making and ensuing legislation.

Some examples of the consideration of ecosystem resilience within legislation include:

- Environmental Planning and Assessment Act 1979 (NSW) – A key goal of the Environmental Assessment procedure is to determine whether proposed development will have a significant impact upon ecosystems.
- Protection of the Environment (Operations) Act 1997 (NSW) – Pollution control is dependent upon keeping levels of pollutants emitted by industrial and other human activities below levels which would be harmful to the environment and its ecosystems. Environmental protection licenses are administered to maintain the environmental objectives of the POEO Act and breaches of license conditions can attract heavy penalties and in some cases criminal convictions.
- Threatened Species Conservation Act 1995 (NSW) – This Act seeks to protect threatened species while balancing it with development.

== History ==
The theoretical basis for many of the ideas central to climate resilience have actually existed since the 1960s. Originally an idea defined for strictly ecological systems, resilience in ecology was initially outlined by C.S. Holling as the capacity for ecological systems and relationships within those systems to persist and absorb changes to "state variables, driving variables, and parameters." This definition helped form the foundation for the notion of ecological equilibrium: the idea that the behavior of natural ecosystems is dictated by a homeostatic drive towards some stable set point. Under this school of thought (which maintained quite a dominant status during this time period), ecosystems were perceived to respond to disturbances largely through negative feedback systems – if there is a change, the ecosystem would act to mitigate that change as much as possible and attempt to return to its prior state.

As greater amounts of scientific research in ecological adaptation and natural resource management was conducted, it became clear that oftentimes, natural systems were subjected to dynamic, transient behaviors that changed how they reacted to significant changes in state variables: rather than work back towards a predetermined equilibrium, the absorbed change was harnessed to establish a new baseline to operate under. Rather than minimize imposed changes, ecosystems could integrate and manage those changes, and use them to fuel the evolution of novel characteristics. This new perspective of resilience as a concept that inherently works synergistically with elements of uncertainty and entropy first began to facilitate changes in the field of adaptive management and environmental resources, through work whose basis was built by Holling and colleagues yet again.

By the mid 1970s, resilience began gaining momentum as an idea in anthropology, culture theory, and other social sciences. There was significant work in these relatively non-traditional fields that helped facilitate the evolution of the resilience perspective as a whole. Part of the reason resilience began moving away from an equilibrium-centric view and towards a more flexible, malleable description of social-ecological systems was due to work such as that of Andrew Vayda and Bonnie McCay in the field of social anthropology, where more modern versions of resilience were deployed to challenge traditional ideals of cultural dynamics.

== See also ==
- Climate change mitigation – Actions to reduce net greenhouse gas emissions to limit climate change
- Climate resilience – Form of adaptive capacity for a socio-ecological system
- Ecology and Society – Academic journal
- Resilience of coral reefs
- Resistance (ecology) – Ability to withstand disturbance unchanged
- Regeneration (ecology) – Ability of an ecosystem to recover from damage
- Ecological stability – When an ecosystem does not drastically change over time even after perturbation
- Socio-ecological system – Biogeophysical unit and associated social actors
- Soil resilience – Ability of a soil to resist or recover its healthy state after disturbance
- Vulnerability – Exposure to risk of harm
- Homeostasis – State of steady internal conditions maintained by living things
