= Beatrice Crona =

Swedish woman ecologist

Beatrice Crona (born 1974) is an ecologist, a professor at Stockholm University, and the executive director of the Program on Global Economic Dynamics and the Biosphere at the Royal Swedish Academy of Sciences. In 2023 she became a science director of the Stockholm Resilience Centre.

== Early life and education ==
Beatrice Crona was born in 1974.

Crona received a joint major in Biology and Geology (BioGeo) from Stockholm University. She has a MSc in Marine Ecotoxicology. In 2006 she received her PhD in Systems Ecology, Marine Ecology, and Natural Resources Management from Stockholm University. Her PhD focused on mangrove ecology and marine governance.

From 2007 to 2008 Crona was a Postdoctoral Fellow at the Center for the Study of Institutional Diversity at Arizona State University, and worked under Professor Marty Anderies. Her postdoc examined adaptive governance and science policy interactions related to water.

== Career and research ==
Beatrice Crona is the Executive Director of the Program on Global Economic Dynamics and the Biosphere (GEDB) at the Royal Swedish Academy of Sciences in Sweden. She has led this program since its inception in 2013. At GEDB she developed research to understand how seafood trade influences marine resource governance outcomes, and researches new approaches to sustainable finance. Beatrice Crona is a leader of the "Patterns of the Anthropocene" research stream at the Stockholm Resilience Centre.

In May 2008, Beatrice began as an assistant professor at the Stockholm Resilience Center, at Stockholm University with funding from Formas, a Swedish research council for sustainable development. She is currently a professor at the Stockholm Resilience Centre at Stockholm University. From 2011 to 2014 Crona was a member of the SRC Strategic Advisory Council and participated in educational initiatives directed at dignitaries. Crona was a part of the EAT-Lancet commission on Healthy Diets from Sustainable Food Systems from 2016 to 2017.

=== Fields ===
Crona works to combine ecology with social-science theories. Her main research involves how trade affects marine resource governance outcomes, the impacts of unsustainable seafood harvesting relating to governance, and understanding how markets affect small-scale fishing operations and poverty levels. She also works on resource governance issues and environmental policy relating to marine ecosystems.

=== Awards and honors ===
Crona was elected as a member of the Young Academy of Sweden and was a member from 2012 to 2017. The Young Academy of Sweden is an interdisciplinary academy that consists prominent young researchers in Sweden.

In 2017, Crona was nominated to be a SIGHT Fellow (Swedish Institute for Global Health Transformation), at Royal Swedish Academy of Science.

Crona is also a member of the E15 expert group on trade and marine resources, by the International Centre for Trade and Sustainable Development in collaboration with the World Economic Forum.

==== Grants ====
Crona received funding in 2018 for a project called ‘Financial Dimensions of a key climate system "Wild Card": The Atmospheric Brown Cloud over South Asia’. She also received a five-year grant in 2016 to see how supply chains can improve fisheries sustainability globally from the Swedish Research Council Formas. In 2015 she received a grant from the Stockholm Resilience Center in 2015 for her paper "Masked, diluted and drowned out: how global seafood trade weakens signals from marine ecosystems"

=== Public engagement ===
She has led hackathons with the fishing industry, and improved reporting guidelines for fisheries improvement projects with Sustainable Fisheries Partnership. She is a Subject Editor for the academic journal, Ecology and Society. Crona has been featured in popular science and public news media channels, such as in Environment Magazine and The Guardian.

== Notable publications ==
- Willett, Walter, Johan Rockström, Brent Loken, Marco Springmann, Tim Lang, Sonja Vermeulen, Tara Garnett et al. "Food in the Anthropocene: the EAT–Lancet Commission on healthy diets from sustainable food systems." The Lancet 393, no. 10170 (2019): 447–492.
- Bodin, Örjan, and Beatrice I. Crona. "The role of social networks in natural resource governance: What relational patterns make a difference?." Global environmental change 19, no. 3 (2009): 366–374.
- Berkes, Fikret, Terry P. Hughes, Robert S. Steneck, James A. Wilson, David R. Bellwood, Beatrice Crona, Carl Folke et al. "Globalization, roving bandits, and marine resources." Science 311, no. 5767 (2006): 1557–1558.
- Walters, Bradley B., Patrik Rönnbäck, John M. Kovacs, Beatrice Crona, Syed Ainul Hussain, Ruchi Badola, Jurgenne H. Primavera, Edward Barbier, and Farid Dahdouh-Guebas. "Ethnobiology, socio-economics and management of mangrove forests: A review." Aquatic Botany 89, no. 2 (2008): 220–236.
- Bodin, Örjan, Beatrice Crona, and Henrik Ernstson. "Social networks in natural resource management: what is there to learn from a structural perspective?." Ecology and society 11, no. 2 (2006).

== Personal life ==
She is married to Tim Daw, who also teaches at the Stockholm Resilience Center. They have two children; a son and a daughter
