= Regime shift =

Abrupt changes in structure and function of systems

Regime shifts are large, abrupt, persistent changes in the structure and function of ecosystems, the climate, financial systems or other complex systems. A regime is a characteristic behaviour of a system which is maintained by mutually reinforced processes or feedbacks. Regimes are considered persistent relative to the time period over which the shift occurs. The change of regimes, or the shift, usually occurs when a smooth change in an internal process (feedback) or a single disturbance (external shocks) triggers a completely different system behavior. Although such non-linear changes have been widely studied in different disciplines ranging from atoms to climate dynamics, regime shifts have gained importance in ecology because they can substantially affect the flow of ecosystem services that societies rely upon, such as provision of food, clean water or climate regulation. Moreover, regime shift occurrence is expected to increase as human influence on the planet increases – the Anthropocene – including current trends on human induced climate change and biodiversity loss. When regime shifts are associated with a critical or bifurcation point, they may also be referred to as critical transitions.

== History of the concept ==
Scholars have been interested in systems exhibiting non-linear change for a long time. Since the early twentieth century, mathematicians have developed a body of concepts and theory for the study of such phenomena based on the study of non-linear system dynamics. This research led to the development of concepts such as catastrophe theory; a branch of bifurcation theory in dynamical systems.

In ecology the idea of systems with multiple regimes, domains of attraction called alternative stable states, only arose in the late '60s based upon the first reflections on the meaning of stability in ecosystems by Richard Lewontin and Crawford "Buzz" Holling. The first work on regime shifts in ecosystems was done in a diversity of ecosystems and included important work by Noy-Meir (1975) in grazing systems; May (1977) in grazing systems, harvesting systems, insect pests and host-parasitoid systems; Jones and Walters (1976) with fisheries systems; and Ludwig et al. (1978) with insect outbreaks.

These early efforts to understand regime shifts were criticized for the difficulty of demonstrating bi-stability, their reliance on simulation models, and lack of high quality long-term data. However, by the 1990s more substantial evidence of regime shifts was collected for kelp forest, coral reefs, drylands and shallow lakes. This work led to revitalization of research on ecological reorganization and the conceptual clarification that resulted in the regime shift conceptual framework in the early 2000s.

Outside of ecology, similar concepts of non-linear change have been developed in other academic disciplines. One example is historical institutionalism in political science, sociology and economics, where concepts like path dependency and critical junctures are used to explain phenomena where the output of a system is determined by its history, or the initial conditions, and where its domains of attraction are reinforced by feedbacks. Concept such as international institutional regimes, socio-technical transitions and increasing returns have an epistemological basis similar to regime shifts, and utilize similar mathematical models.

== Current applications of the regime shift concept ==
During the last decades, research on regime shift has grown exponentially. Academic papers reported by ISI Web of Knowledge rose from less than 5 per year prior to 1990 to more than 300 per year from 2007 to 2011. However, the application of regime shift related concepts is still contested.

Although there is not agreement on one definition, the slight differences among definitions reside on the meaning of stability – the measure of what a regime is – and the meaning of abruptness. Both depend on the definition of the system under study, thus it is relative. At the end it is a matter of scale. Mass extinctions are regime shifts on the geological time scale, while financial crises or pest outbreaks are regime shifts that require a totally different parameter setting.

In order to apply the concept to a particular problem, one has to conceptually limit its range of dynamics by fixing analytical categories such as time and space scales, range of variations and exogenous / endogenous processes. For example, while for oceanographers a regime must last for at least decades and should include climate variability as a driver, for marine biologists regimes of only five years are acceptable and could be induced by only population dynamics. A non-exhaustive range of current definitions of regime shifts in recent scientific literature from ecology and allied fields is collected in Table 1.

Table 1. Definitions of regime shifts and modifications used to apply the concept to particular research questions from scientific literature published between 2004 and 2009.

Source	Definition	Modification
Collie et al. 2004	"Three different types of regime shift (smooth, abrupt and discontinuous) are identified on the basis of different patterns in the relationship between the response of an ecosystem variable (usually biotic) and some external forcing or condition (control variable). The smooth regime shift is represent by a quasi-linear relationship between the response and control variables. The abrupt regime shift exhibits a nonlinear relationship between the response and control variables, and the discontinuous regime shift is characterized by the trajectory of the response variable differing when the forcing variable increases compared to when it decreases (i.e., the occurrence of alternative "stable" states)"	""Regime shifts" are considered here to be low-frequency, high-amplitude changes in oceanic conditions that may be especially pronounced in biological variables and propagate through several trophic levels"
Bakun 2004 (in Collie et al. 2004)		"persistent radical shift in typical levels of abundance or productivity of multiple important components of marine biological community structure, occurring at multiple trophic levels and on a geographical scale that is at least regional in extent"
Walker & Meyers, 2004	"A regime shift involving alternate stable states occurs when a threshold level of a controlling variable in a system is passed, such that the nature and extend of feedbacks change, resulting in a change of direction (the trajectory) of the system itself. A shift occurs when internal processes of the system ... have changed and the state of the system ... begins to change in a different direction, toward a different attractor."	
Andersen et al. 2009		"ecological regime shifts can be defined as abrupt changes on several trophic levels leading to rapid ecosystem reconfiguration between alternative states"
Cumming & Norberg, 2008	"the ability of a system to internally switch between different self reinforcing processes that dominate how the system functions"	
Brock, Carpenter and Scheffer 2008 (Chap 6 in Cumming and Norberg)	"Regime shifts, substantial reorganizations of complex systems with prolonged consequences ... In environmental policy regime shifts raise the prospect that incremental stresses may evoke large, unexpected changes in ecosystem services and human livelihoods"	
Biggs et al. 2009	"Ecological regime shifts are large, sudden changes in ecosystems that last of substantial periods of time ... Regime shifts entail changes in the internal dynamics and feedbacks of an ecosystem that often prevent it from returning to a previous regime, even when the driver that precipitated the shift is reduced or removed ... Regime shifts typically result from a combination of gradual changes in an underlying driving variable (or set of variables), combined with an external shock, such as a storm or fire"	"We defined a regime shift as the period over which the annual increase in the planktivore (F) population exceeded 10%. In the model, regime shifts have a typical duration of ≈15 years, reflecting plausible limits on the growth rate of F"
Norström et al. 2009	"Certain conditions may ultimately result in persistent alternative stable states (ASS), which are characterized by a different set of ecosystems processes, functions and feedback mechanisms..."	"we defined phase shifts as an extensive decreases in coral cover coinciding with substantial increases in some alternative benthic organism, due to a pulse or press disturbance, that have persisted >5yr. A minimum persistence time of 5 yr was used, as this is in accordance with the timeframe of studies describing cases of phase shifts from coral to macroalgal states..."
Scheffer (2009)	"a relatively sharp change from one regime to a contrasting one, where a regime is a dynamic 'state' of a system with its characteristics stochastic fluctuations and/or cycles"	

== Theoretical basis ==
The theoretical basis for regime shifts has been developed from the mathematics of non-linear systems. In short, regime shifts describe dynamics characterized by the possibility that a small disturbance can produce big effects. In such situations the common notion of proportionality between inputs and outputs of a system is incorrect. Conversely, the regime shift concept also emphasizes the resilience of systems – suggesting that in some situations substantial management or human impact can have little effect on a system. Regime shifts are hard to reverse and in some cases irreversible. The regime shift concept shifts analytical attention away from linearity and predictability, towards reorganization and surprise. Thus, the regime shift concept offers a framework to explore the dynamics and causal explanations of non-linear change in nature and society.

Regime shifts are triggered either by the weakening of stabilizing internal processes – feedbacks – or by external shocks which exceed the stabilizing capacity of a system.

Systems prone to regime shifts can show three different types of change: smooth, abrupt or discontinuous, depending on the configuration of processes that define a system – in particular the interaction between a system's fast and slow processes. Smooth change can be described by a quasi-linear relationship between fast and slow processes; abrupt change shows a non-linear relationship among fast and slow variables, while discontinuous change is characterized by the difference in the trajectory on the fast variable when the slow one increases compared to when it decreases. In other words, the point at which the system flips from one regime to another is different from the point at which the system flips back. Systems that exhibit this last type of change demonstrate hysteresis. Hysteretic systems have two important properties. First, the reversal of discontinuous change requires that a system change back past the conditions at which the change first occurred. This occurs because systemic change alters feedback processes that maintain a system in a particular regime. Second, hysteresis greatly enhances the role of history in a system, and demonstrates that the system has memory – in that its dynamics are shaped by past events.

Conditions at which a system shifts its dynamics from one set of processes to another are often called thresholds. In ecology for example, a threshold is a point at which there is an abrupt change in an ecosystem quality, property or phenomenon; or where small changes in an environmental driver produce large responses in an ecosystem. Thresholds are, however, a function of several interacting parameters, thus they change in time and space. Hence, the same system can present smooth, abrupt or discontinuous change depending on its parameters' configurations. Thresholds will be present, however, only in cases where abrupt and discontinuous change is possible.

== Evidence ==
Empirical evidence has increasingly completed model based work on regime shifts. Early work on regime shifts in ecology was developed in models for predation, grazing, fisheries and inset outbreak dynamics. Since the 1980s, further development of models has been complemented by empirical evidence for regime shifts from ecosystems including kelp forest, coral reefs, drylands and lakes.

Scholars have collected evidence for regime shifts across a wide variety of ecosystems and across a range of scales. For example, at the local scale, one of the best documented examples is woody plant encroachment, which is thought to follow a smooth change dynamic. Woody encroachment refers to small changes in herbivory rates that can shift drylands from grassy dominated regimes towards woody dominated savannas. Encroachment has been documented to impact ecosystem services related with cattle ranching in wet savannas in Africa and South America. At the regional scale, rainforest areas in the Amazon and East Asia are thought to be at risk of shifting towards savanna regimes given the weakening of the moisture recycling feedback driven by deforestation. The shift from forest to savanna potentially affects the provision of food, fresh water, climate regulation and support for biodiversity. On the global realm, the faster retreating of the arctic ice sheet in summer time is reinforcing climate warming through the albedo feedback, potentially affecting sea water levels and climate regulation worldwide.

Aquatic systems have been heavily studied in the search for regime shifts. Lakes work like microcosms (almost closed systems) that to some extent allow experimentation and data gathering. Eutrophication is a well-documented abrupt change from clear water to murky water regimes, which leads to toxic algae blooms and reduction of fish productivity in lakes and coastal ecosystems. Eutrophication is driven by nutrient inputs, particularly those coming from fertilizers used in agriculture. It is an example of discontinuous change with hysteresis. Once the lake has shifted to a murky water regime, a new feedback of phosphorus recycling maintains the system in the eutrophic state even if nutrient inputs are significantly reduced.

Another example widely studied in aquatic and marine systems is trophic level decline in food webs. It usually implies the shift from ecosystems dominated by high numbers of predatory fish to a regime dominated by lower trophic groups like pelagic planktivores (i.e. jellyfish). Affected food webs often have impacts on fisheries productivity, a major risk of eutrophication, hypoxia, invasion of non-native species and impacts on recreational values. Hypoxia, or the development of so-called death zones, is another regime shift in aquatic and marine-coastal environments. Hypoxia, similarly to eutrophication, is driven by nutrient inputs of anthropogenic origin but also from natural origin in the form of upwellings. In high nutrient concentrations the levels of dissolved oxygen decrease, making life impossible for the majority of aquatic organisms. Impacts on ecosystem services include collapse of fisheries and the production of toxic gases for humans.

In marine systems, two well-studied regime shifts happen in coral reefs and kelp forests. Coral reefs are three-dimensional structures which work as habitat for marine biodiversity. Hard coral-dominated reefs can shift to a regime dominated by fleshy algae; but they also have been reported to shift towards soft-corals, corallimorpharians, urchin barrens or sponge-dominated regimes. Coral reef transitions are reported to affect ecosystem services like calcium fixation, water cleansing, support for biodiversity, fisheries productivity, coastline protection and recreational services. On the other hand, kelp forests are highly productive marine ecosystems found in temperate regions of the ocean. Kelp forests are characteristically dominated by brown macroalgae and host high levels of biodiversity, providing provisioning ecosystem services for both the cosmetic industry and fisheries. Such services are substantially reduced when a kelp forest shifts towards urchin barren regimes driven mainly by discharge of nutrients from the coast and overfishing. Overfishing and overharvest of keystone predators, such as sea otters, applies top-down pressure on the system. Bottom-up pressure arises from nutrient pollution.

Soil salinization is an example of a well-known regime shift in terrestrial systems. It is driven by the removal of deep root vegetation and irrigation, which causes elevation of the soil water table and the increase of soil surface salinity. Once the system flips, ecosystem services related with food production – both crops and cattle – are significantly reduced. Dryland degradation, also known as desertification, is a well-known but controversial type of regime shift. Dryland degradation occurs when the loss of vegetation transforms an ecosystem from being vegetated to being dominated by bare soils. While this shift has been proposed to be driven by a combination of farming and cattle grazing, loss of semi-nomad traditions, extension of infrastructure, reduction of managerial flexibility and other economic factors, it is controversial because it has been difficult to determine whether there is indeed a regime shift and which drivers have caused it. For example, poverty has been proposed as a driver of dry land degradation, but studies continuously find contradictory evidence. Ecosystem services affected by dry land degradation usually include low biomass productivity, thus reducing provisioning and supporting services for agriculture and water cycling.

Polar regions have been the focus on research examining the impacts of climate warming. Regime shifts in polar regions include the melting of the Greenland ice sheet and the possible collapse of the thermohaline circulation system. While the melting of the Greenland ice sheet is driven by global warming and threatens worldwide coastlines with an increase of sea level, the collapse of the thermohaline circulation is driven by the increase of fresh water in the North Atlantic which in turn weakens the density driven water transport between the tropics and polar areas. Both regime shifts have serious implications for marine biodiversity, water cycling, security of housing and infrastructure and climate regulation amongst other ecosystem services.

== Detection of whether a regime shift has occurred ==
Using current well-known statistical methods such as average standard deviates, principal component analysis, or artificial neural networks one can detect whether a regime shift has occurred. Such analyses require long term data series and that the threshold under study has to be crossed. Hence, the answer will depend on the quality of the data; it is event-driven and only allows one to explore past trends.

Some scholars have argued based on statistical analysis of time series that certain phenomena do not correspond to regime shifts. Nevertheless, the statistical rejection of the hypothesis that a system has multiple attractors does not imply that the null hypothesis is true. In order to do so one has to prove that the system only has one attractor. In other words, evidence that data does not exhibit multiple regimes does not rule out the possibility a system could shift to an alternative regime in the future. Moreover, in management decision making, it can be risky to assume that a system has only one regime, when plausible alternative regimes have highly negative consequences.

On the other hand, a more relevant question than "has a regime shift occurred?" is "is the system prone to regime shifts?". This question is important because, even if they have shown smooth change in the past, their dynamics can potentially become abrupt or discontinuous in the future depending on its parameters' configuration. Such a question has been explored separately in different disciplines for different systems, pushing methods development forward (e.g. climate driven regime shifts in the ocean or the stability of food webs) and continuing to inspire new research.

== Frontiers of research ==
Regime shift research is occurring across multiple ecosystems and at multiple scales. New areas of research include early warnings of regime shifts and new forms of modeling.

=== Early-warning signals and critical slowing down ===
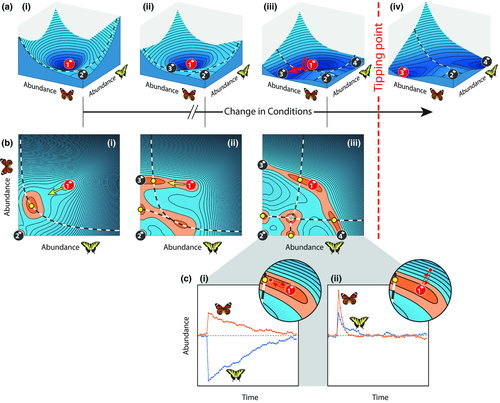
Graphical representation of alternative stable states and the direction of critical slowing down prior to a critical transition (taken from Lever et al. 2020). Top panels (a) indicate stability landscapes at different conditions. Middle panels (b) indicate the rates of change akin to the slope of the stability landscapes, and bottom panels (c) indicate a recovery from a perturbation towards the system's future state (c.I) and in another direction (c.II).

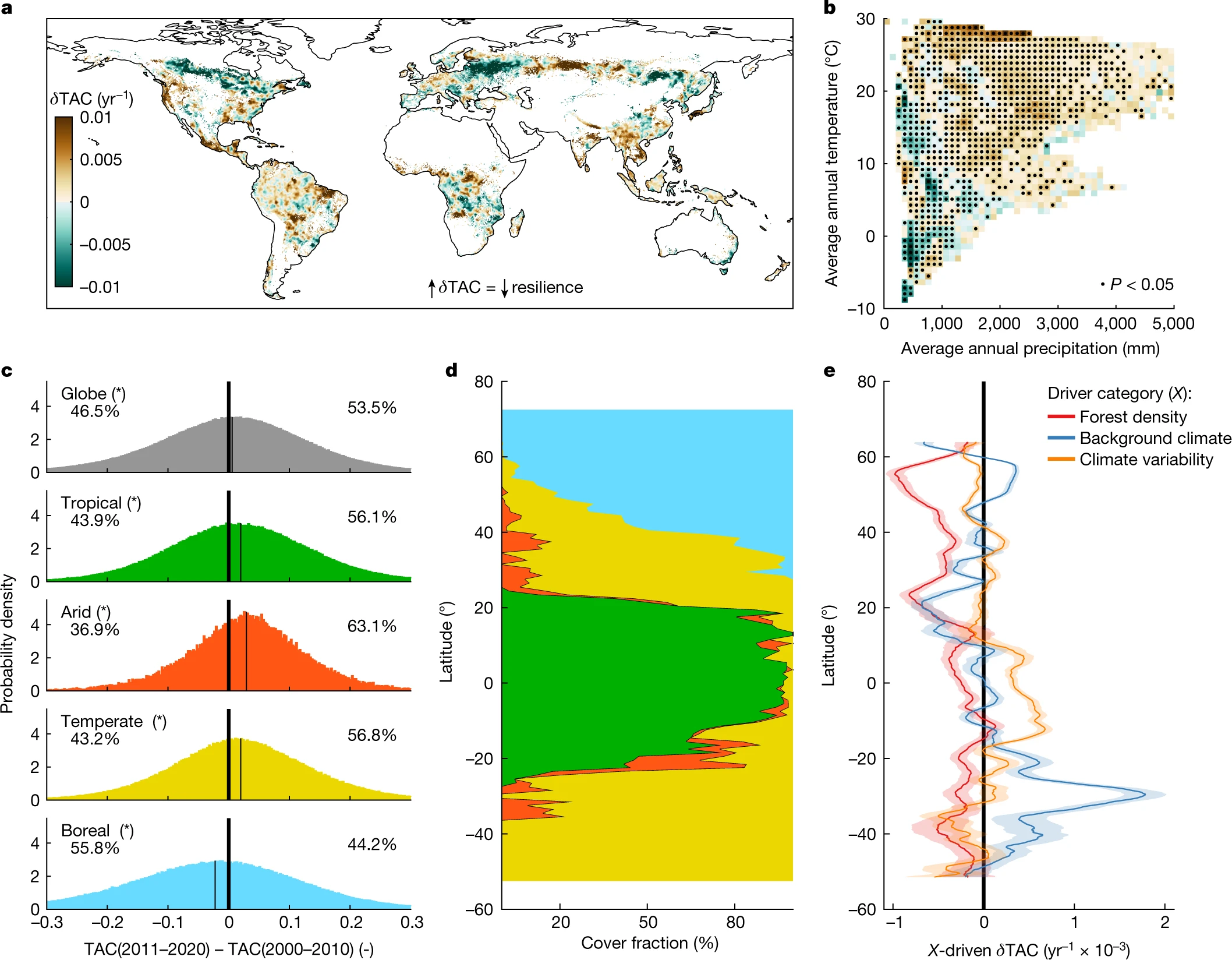
Temporal variations of forest resilience and its key drivers

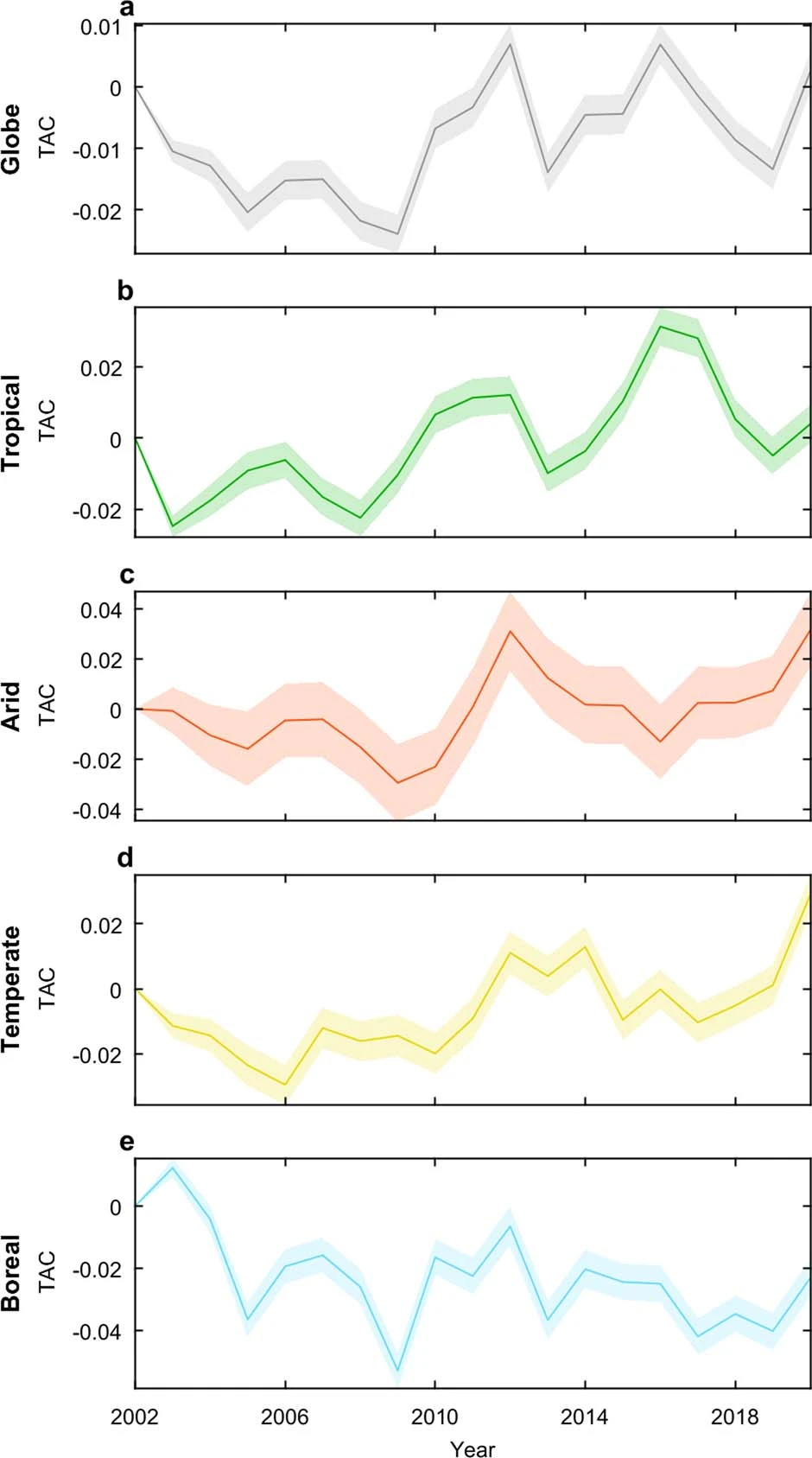
Emerging signals of declining forest resilience under climate change

Significant efforts have been made to identify early-warning signals of critical transitions. Systems approaching a bifurcation point show a characteristic behaviour called critical slowing down leading to an increasingly slow recovery from perturbations. This, in turn, may lead to an increase in (spatial or temporal) autocorrelation and variance, while variance spectra tend to lower frequencies, and the 'direction of critical slowing down' in a system's state space may be indicative of a system's future state when delayed negative feedbacks leading to oscillatory or other complex dynamics are weak. Researchers have explored early-warning signals in lakes, climate dynamics, the Amazon rainforest, forests worldwide, food webs, dry-land transitions and epilepsy attacks.

It remains unclear how well such signals work for all regime shifts, and if the early warnings give time enough to take appropriate managerial corrections to avoid the shift. Additionally, early warning signals also depend on intensive good-quality data series that are rare in ecology. However, researchers have used high quality data to predict regime shifts in a lake ecosystem. Changes in spatial patterns as an indicator of regime shifts have also become a topic of research.

=== New approaches to modeling ===
Another front of research is the development of new approaches to modeling. Dynamic models, Bayesian belief networks, Fisher information, and fuzzy cognitive maps have been used as a tool to explore the phase space where regime shifts are likely to happen and understand the dynamics that govern dynamic thresholds. Models are useful oversimplifications of reality, whose limits are given by the current understanding of the real system as well as the assumptions of the modeler. Therefore, a deep understanding of causal relationships and the strength of feedbacks is required to capture possible regime shift dynamics. Nevertheless, such deep understanding is available only for heavily studied systems such as shallow lakes. Methods development is required to tackle the problem of limited time series data and limited understanding of system dynamics, in such a way that allow identification of the main drivers of regime shifts as well as prioritization of managerial options.

=== Other emerging areas ===
Other emerging areas of research include the role of regime shifts in the earth system, cascading consequences among regime shifts, and regime shifts in social-ecological systems.
