= Ambio =

- Discipline: Environmental science
- Language: English
- Edited by: Bo Söderström

Publication details
- History: 1972–present
- Publisher: Springer Science+Business Media on behalf of the Royal Swedish Academy of Sciences (Sweden)
- Frequency: Monthly
- Open access: Hybrid
- Impact factor: 6.943 (2021)

Standard abbreviations
- ISO 4: Ambio

Indexing
- CODEN: AMBOCX
- ISSN: 0044-7447 (print); 1654-7209 (web)
- LCCN: 72623229
- JSTOR: 00447447
- OCLC no.: 1074032

Links
- Journal homepage; Online archive

Ambio: A Journal of Environment and Society is a monthly peer-reviewed scientific journal published by Springer Science+Business Media on behalf of the Royal Swedish Academy of Sciences. It was established in 1972. The editor-in-chief is Bo Söderström (Royal Swedish Academy of Sciences). It covers research concerning the human environment, including ecology, environmental economics, geology, geochemistry, geophysics, physical geography, human geography, paleontology, hydrology, water resources, oceanography, Earth sciences, meteorology, and other subjects.

According to the Journal Citation Reports, the journal has a 2021 impact factor of 6.943, ranking it 18th out of 54 journals in the category "Engineering, Environmental" and 56th out of 279 journals in the category "Environmental Sciences".
