= Gustaf Andersson (footballer, born 1979) =

Swedish footballer

Personal information
- Full name: Gustaf Oskar Johan Andersson
- Date of birth: 6 November 1979 (age 46)
- Height: 1.86 m (6 ft 1 in)
- Position: Defender

Senior career*
Years	Team	Apps	(Gls)
1999–2004	Örebro SK		
2005	Landskrona BoIS		
2006	Sandefjord	1	(0)
- * Club domestic league appearances and goals

Gustaf Andersson (born 6 November 1979) is a Swedish retired football defender. After his career he changed his last name to Crona.
