= C. S. Holling =

Canadian ecologist (1930–2019)

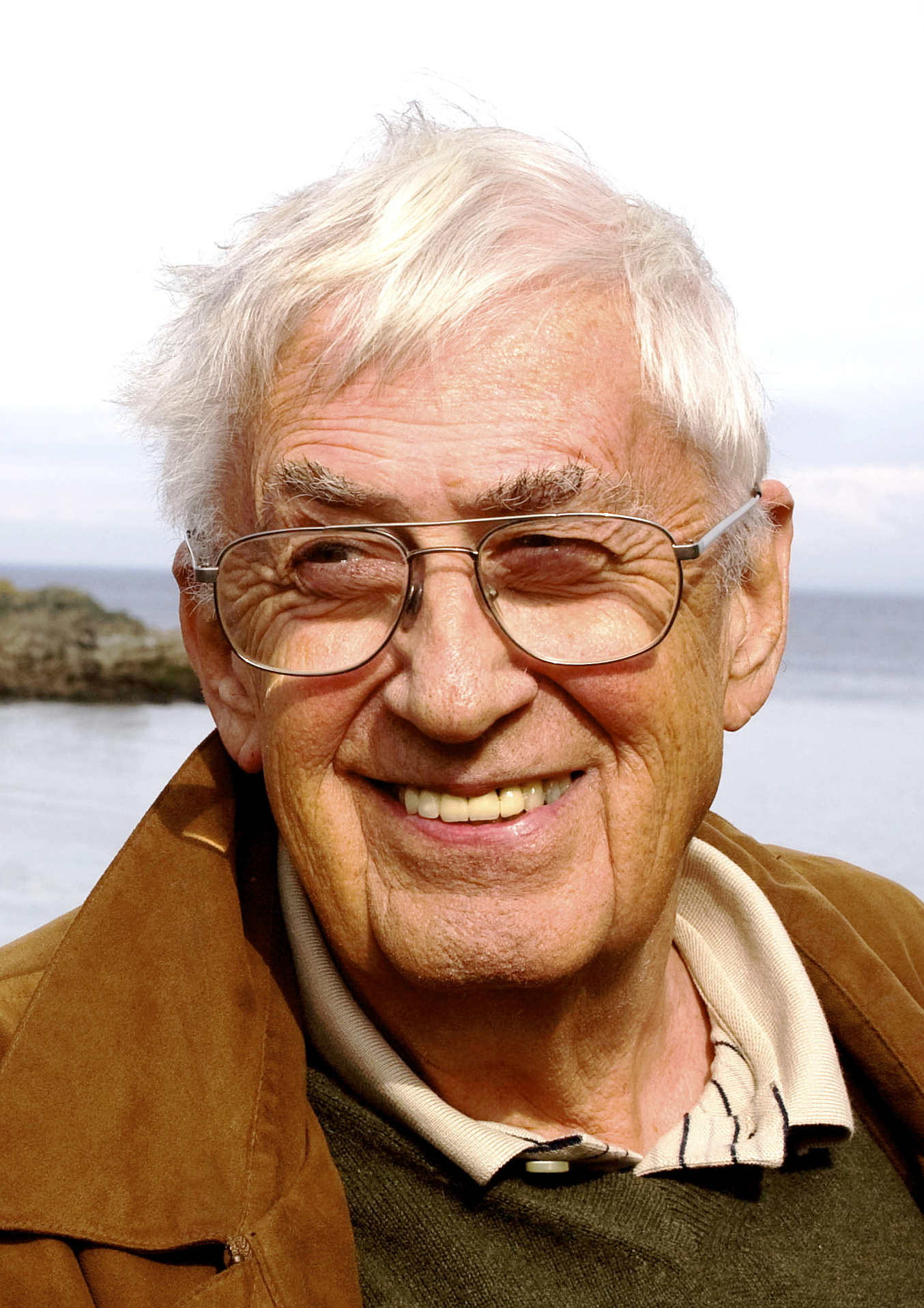
- Born: December 6, 1930; Theresa, New York, U.S.
- Died: August 16, 2019 (aged 88); Nanaimo, British Columbia, Canada
- Education: University of Toronto; University of British Columbia
- Known for: Co-founder of ecological economics
- Awards: Volvo Environment Prize (2008); Order of Canada (2009); ISEE Kenneth Boulding Award for Ecological Economics
- Scientific career
- Fields: Ecology
- Workplaces: University of Florida
- Thesis: The components of predation as revealed by a study of predation by small mammals of Neodiprion sertifer (Geoff.) (1957)
- Doctoral advisor: Ian McTaggart-Cowan
- Doctoral students: William C. Clark; Patrick Moore

Crawford Stanley "Buzz" Holling OC FRSC (December 6, 1930 – August 16, 2019) was a Canadian ecologist and emeritus eminent scholar and professor in ecological sciences at the University of Florida. Holling was one of the conceptual founders of ecological economics.

== Biography ==
Crawford Stanley Holling was born in 1930 in the United States to Canadian parents. He grew up in Northern Ontario, which was where he first became interested in nature. As a teenager he was a member of the Royal Ontario Museum's Toronto Junior Field Naturalists.

Holling received his B.A. and M.Sc. at the University of Toronto in 1952 and his Ph.D. at the University of British Columbia in 1957. He worked for several years in the Canadian Department of Forestry in Sault Ste. Marie, Ontario.

After working for Forestry Canada, Buzz Holling was, at various times, Professor and Director of the Institute of Animal Resource Ecology, University of British Columbia, Director of the International Institute for Applied Systems Analysis in Vienna, and Eminent Scholar, Arthur R. Marshall Jr. Chair in Ecological Sciences in the Department of Zoology at the University of Florida.

He retired from the University of Florida in 1999, but remained on the faculty as an Emeritus Eminent Scholar.

He was awarded two major awards from the Ecological Society of America, the Mercer Award given to a young scientist in recognition of an outstanding paper in ecology in 1966, and the Eminent Ecologist Award for "outstanding contributions to the science of Ecology" in 1999. He also received the Kenneth Boulding Memorial Prize, in 2000, the Volvo Environment Prize in 2008, an Honorary Doctor of Science from the University of Guelph in 1998, and an Honorary Doctor of Science from the Simon Fraser University in 2011. He was a Fellow of the Royal Society of Canada, a foreign Fellow of the Royal Swedish Academy of Sciences, and has been awarded the Austrian Cross of Honour for Science and Art. In 2009, he was made an Officer of the Order of Canada "for his pioneering contributions to the field of ecology, notably for his work on ecosystem dynamics, resilience theory and ecological economics". He was one of the inaugural Fellows of the Ecological Society of America, elected in 2012.

He was founding editor-in-chief of the open access on-line journal Conservation Ecology, now renamed Ecology and Society. He was also the founder of the Resilience Alliance, an international science network.

== Work ==
Throughout his research, C. S. Holling blended systems theory and ecology with simulation modeling and policy analysis to develop integrative theories of change that have practical utility. He has introduced important ideas in the application of ecology and evolution, including resilience, adaptive management, the adaptive cycle, and panarchy.

His early work included major contributions to population and behavioural ecology. Later, he was among the first ecologists to recognize the importance of nonlinear dynamics. This early work on predation led to a series of papers, including his 1959 Citation Classic paper in the Canadian Entomologist, in which he developed the notion of functional response (the relationship between prey density and the rate at which prey is eaten), an idea that continues to be a linchpin of modern population ecology.

His 1973 paper on the resilience of ecological systems had a substantial impact within ecology and other natural and social sciences. He has also contributed important ideas to ecological management, including Adaptive management and the Adaptive Cycle. More recently his work on the cross-scale structure and dynamics of ecosystems has been highly influential. This work resulted in the 2002 book Panarchy: understanding transformations in human and natural systems.

His work is frequently cited in the fields of ecology, environmental management, ecological economics and the human dimensions of global change.

== Literature ==
C.S. Holling has edited or co-edited several books:

- 1978. Adaptive environmental assessment and management. (Editor) London: John Wiley & Sons.
- 1995. Barriers and bridges to the renewal of ecosystems and institutions. Edited with L. Gunderson and S. Light (editors) New York, NY: Columbia University Press.
- 2002. Panarchy: understanding transformations in human and natural systems. Edited with L. Gunderson, (editors) Washington, DC: Island Press.
- 2008. Discontinuities in Ecosystems and Other Complex Systems. Edited with Craig R. Allen, New York, NY : Columbia University Press.
- 2010. Foundations of ecological resilience. L. H. Gunderson, C. R. Allen, and C. S. Holling, (editors): Island Press.

C.S. Holling's most cited articles include:

- 1959 "The components of predation as revealed by a study of small mammal predation of the European Pine Sawfly". in: Canadian Entomologist. Vol 91 : 293–320.
- 1973. "Resilience and stability of ecological systems". in: Annual Review of Ecology and Systematics. Vol 4 :1-23.
- 1978, with D. Ludwig, D. and D.D. Jones. in: "Qualitative analysis of insect outbreak systems". Journal of Animal Ecology. Vol 47 (1): 315–332.
- 1990, with C.J. Walters, "Large-scale management experiments and learning by doing", in: Ecology. Vol 71 (6): 2060-2068
- 1992, "Cross-scale Morphology, geometry, and dynamics of ecosystems". in: Ecological Monographs. Vol 62 (4): 447-502
- 1996, with G.K. Meffe. "Command and control and the pathology of natural resource management". in: Conservation Biology. Vol 10 (2): 328–337.
