= Resilience Alliance =

International research network

- Established: 1999
- Website: resalliance.org

The Resilience Alliance is an interdisciplinary network of scientists and practitioners that analyze the integrated dynamic of people and nature from a social-ecological system perspective. It was established in 1999 and is supported by an international network of member institutions that includes universities, government, and non-government agencies. The Resilience Alliance publishes the journal Ecology and Society.

In 2007, the Resilience Alliance Young Scholars (RAYS) was established under Resilience Alliance. This network was established with a purpose of developing the next generation of resilience scientists from around the world.
