= Hummingbird (disambiguation) =

A hummingbird is a member of a family (Trochilidae) of very small birds.

Hummingbird or Humming bird may also refer to:

== Music ==
- The Hummingbirds, an Australian jangle pop band
- Gibson Hummingbird, an acoustic guitar
- Humming Bird Records, a record label
- Hummingbird (band), a late 1970s British rock band

=== Albums ===
- Hummingbird (Rick Wakeman and Dave Cousins album), a 2002 album
- Hummingbird, a 2005 album by Jessica Robinson
- Hummingbird (Local Natives album), a 2013 album
- Humming Bird (Paul Gonsalves album), 1970
- Hummingbird (Black Party album), 2022
- Hummingbird (Carly Pearce album), 2024

=== Songs ===
- Hummingbird, a 2001 single by Merzbow
- "Hummingbird" (1955 song), a 1955 pop song
- "Hummingbird" (Metro Boomin and James Blake song), 2023
- "Hummingbird", a song by Cat Stevens from the album Matthew and Son, 1967
- "Hummingbird" (Seals and Crofts song), 1972
- "Hummingbird", a song by Jimmy Page from the 1988 album Outrider, written and composed by Leon Russell
- "Hummingbird" (Restless Heart song), covered by Ricky Skaggs
- "Hummingbirds", a single by Venus Hum from the 2001 album Venus Hum
- "Hummingbird", a song by Wilco on the 2004 album A Ghost Is Born
- "Hummingbird", a single by Born Ruffians from the 2008 album Red, Yellow & Blue
- "Hummingbird", a song by Cheryl on her 2010 album Messy Little Raindrops
- "Humming Bird", a song by Indica on their 2014 album Shine

== Transportation ==
- Boeing A160 Hummingbird, a pilotless helicopter
- de Havilland Humming Bird, a 1920s ultralight monoplane
- Gemini Hummingbird, ultralight aircraft
- Humming Bird (train), of the Louisville and Nashville Railroad
- Hummingbird Highway in Belize
- Lockheed XV-4 Hummingbird, an experimental vertical takeoff jet airplane
- Nelson Hummingbird PG-185B motorglider
- Vertical Hummingbird, a kit helicopter
- Bersey Electric Cab, late 1890s taxi named for its humming sound

== Technology ==
- Hummingbird Processor, a mobile processor from Samsung
- Hummingbird Ltd., a subsidiary of Open Text which produces the Exceed software product
- Google Hummingbird, a search engine algorithm used by Google
- See also Hummingbad, a type of malware for Android phones and tablets

== Media ==
- Hummingbird (film), a 2013 film starring Jason Statham
- The Humming Bird, a 1924 American silent crime drama film
- The Humming Bird, or Herald of Taste, the first American women's magazine edited by a woman
- Hummingbird (comics), the codename of Aracely Penalba, a Marvel Comics character
- The Hummingbird, a 2019 novel by Sandro Veronesi
- The Hummingbird (2022 film), a film adaptation of the 2019 novel
- The Hummingbird Project, a 2018 film

== Other ==
- Macroglossum stellatarum, the hummingbird Hawk-moth
- Idol Defense Force Hummingbird, a 1993 four-episode OVA anime series
- Hummingbirds (book), 2016 book
- Hummingbird cake, a Jamaican banana-pineapple spice cake
- The Hummingbird, a nightclub in Birmingham, England, now known as Forum Birmingham
