= George Thengummoottil =

Indian filmmaker

George Thengummoottil ജോര്‍ജ് തെങ്ങുംമൂട്ടില്‍
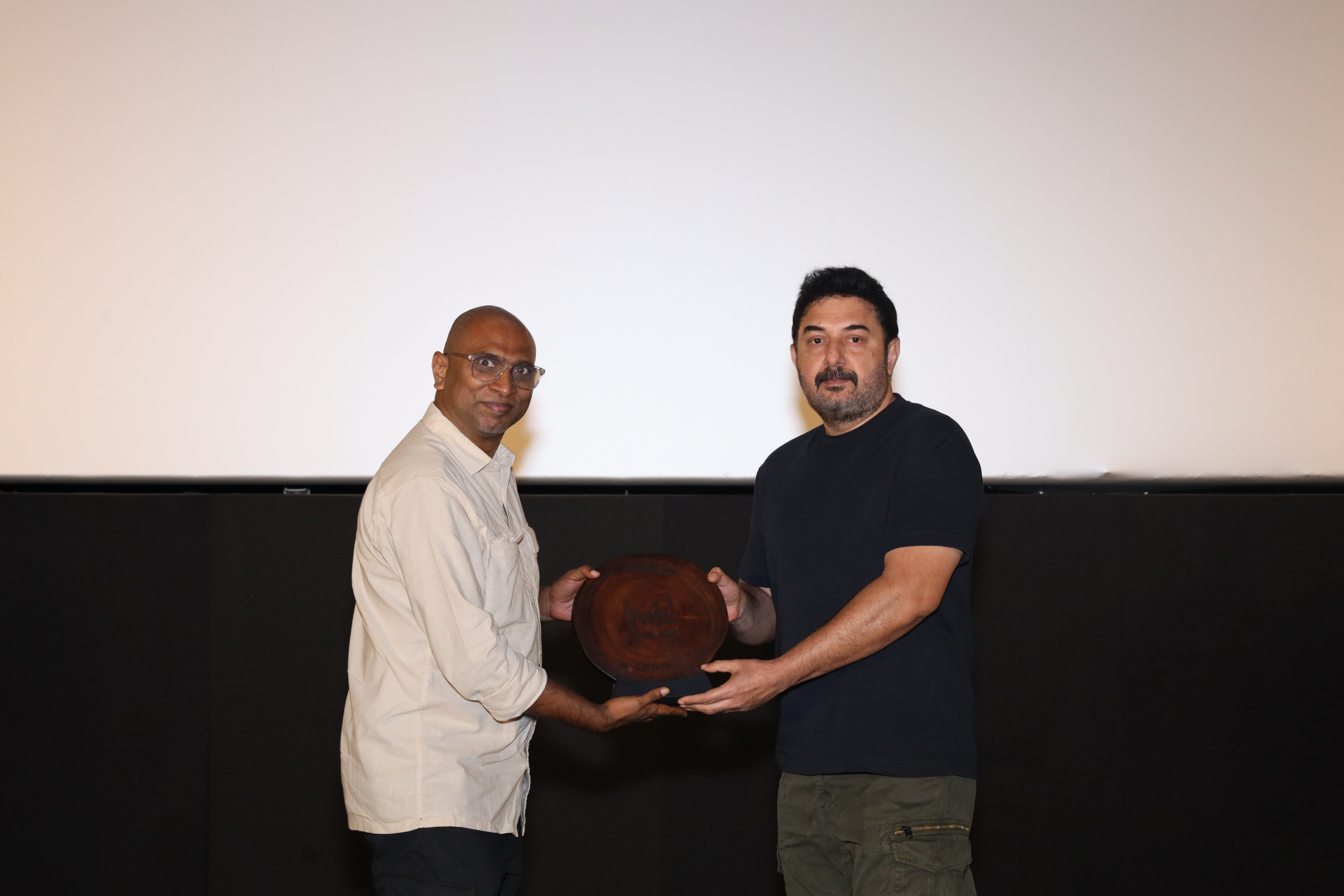
- George Thengummoottil receiving memento from Arvind Swamy during the launch of Wild Tamil Nadu at Chennai India
- Born: 10 January 1985 (age 41); Palakkad, Kerala, India
- Education: Marian College, Mahatma Gandhi University, PSG College of Arts and Science, Satyajit Ray Film and Television Institute
- Occupations: Writer, documentary film maker, photographer
- Website: https://moundain.com/

George Thengummoottil (born 10 January 1985) is an Indian filmmaker and editor. He has also DIT for the 2022 Academy award winning documentary The Elephant Whisperers. His films have been nominated for several film festivals like International Documentary and short-film festival of Kerala and CMS Vatavaran film festival. In 2023 he founded Moundain Films, a visual arts company based in Bangalore, India which specializes in making documentaries.

== Early life and education ==
George was born in the town of Palakkad, Kerala on 10 January 1985. George Thengummoottil did his primary school education at Marthoma Senior Secondary School. He did his graduation in Computer Science at Marian College Kuttikkanam, Peermade. During when he wrote his first book The Story of Peermade, a book about the history of Peermade. He obtained Masters in Computer Science from Dr G R Damodaran College of Science, Coimbatore and later another Masters in Communication and Journalism from PSG College of Arts and Science, Coimbatore. He has also completed short course on Application of Sound in Film and Television from Satyajit Ray Film and Television Institute.

== Keratoconus ==
During his teenage, he was affected by Keratoconus, a degenerative disorder of the eye and was blind by the age of 13. He had to stop his studies and activities. Later he did Corneal transplantation and could partially recover vision in one of his eyes.

== Career ==
George was campus placed in Machine Vision and Robotics at Lucid Imaging, Bangalore after his post graduation. Even though the company offered cover of his treatments he could not continue for a long time due to Keratoconus. George was invited to work as a lecturer at Sherubtse College in Bhutan, where he served for several Years. Later he worked as a journalist with Times of India, Coimbatore and later worked with filmmaker Sandesh Kadur at Felis Creations before starting as an independent wildlife filmmaker.

=== Film making ===
After his Masters in Journalism, he started making short edits, while working at Felis Creations and started as a documentary editor. In 2022, he founded Moundain Private Limited, which specializes on production and post-production of documentaries.

George was also motivational speaker and has been involved in many technical and art projects. He was instrumental to popularize the use of solar panels for filming in remote places.

=== Community initiatives ===
George is the founder of Keratoconus Foundation India, a charitable trust registered under Indian Trusts Act, 1882 which guides Keratoconus patients in India to lead a better life and support them economically.

== Books ==
Year	Title	Credit	
2015	Guhanagari A Book on Urban Wildlife	Contributor	Author : Pradeep Hegde
2013	Kaziranga National Park 2013	Illustrator	Photography: Sanesh Kadur, Author Priya Singh
2012	Himalaya: Mountains of Life	Illustrator	Kamaljit S. Bawa, Sandesh Kadur
2006	The Story of Peermade	Author / Photographer	

== Filmography ==
Year	Title	Genre	Credit	Film Festivals	Production company
2026	In the Heart of the Tide	Short Documentary	Editor	South Asian Short Film FestivalCMS Vatavaran Film festival	Munmun Dhalaria Aga Khan Foundation Terra FIlms
2025	Batman and the Bawali	Short Documentary	Editor, Sound Recordist	Santiago Wild Festival	Roundglass Sustain
2025	The Dooars World	Feature Documentary	Editor	ALT EFF Film Festival, 2025Fest5 International Film Festival Fest5 International Film Festival 2026	Lens and Stories Warner Bros
2025	Bread of Hope	Short Documentary	Editor, Assistant Director		Q Pearl, Qatar
2025	Wild Tamil nadu	Feature Documentary	Additional Editor	Wildscreen Panda Award CMS Vatavaran Film festival	Kalyan Varma Nature in Focus, Sundaram Motors
2025	Land of the Blackbucks	Short Documentary	Editor	International Documentary and Short Film Festival of Kerala, 2025CMS Vatavaran Film festival	Trailing Wild Productions, India
2024	Angasamudra	Short Documentary	Editor		Roundglass Sustain
2024	The Artist and his Bengaluru	Documentary / Biography	Editor		Aarnavi Films; Moundain
2024	The Fable	Feature Film			
2023	KODAGU – Where Rivers Set The Rhythm	Short Documentary	Editor	International Documentary and Shortfilm festival of Kerala Cambodia International Film Festival CMS Vatavaran Film festival	Felis Creations
2023	Dandeli Mosale	Short Documentary	Editor		Karnataka Forest Department Kalinga Foundation
2022	Elephant Whisperers	Documentary	DIT	95th Academy Awards for best short documentary	Netflix Kartiki Gonsalvus
2021	The Secret life of Bhopal Tigers	Documentary	Editor	Wildlife Film Festival of Rotterdam	Nature Candid LLP Madhya Pradesh Forest Department
2020	Wild Cats of India	TV Series	Animation	CMS Vatavaran Film Festival, New Delhi	National Geographic
2020	The Ridge Story	Short Documentary	Editing	Indian Mountaineering Film Festival	Arpita Roy (Mountaineer)
2020	Communities and Sustainability	Documentary	Editor	International Science Film Festival of India, Ministry of Science and Technology, Government of India	Ashoka Trust Trailing Wild
2020	Communities and Sustainability	Documentary	Editor	CMS Vatavaran Film Festival, New Delhi	
2018	Sarala Virala	Documentary	Design	66th National Film Awards for best Educational Film	
2018	The Naga Pride	Documentary	Editor / Sound Design	CMS Vatavaran Film Festival	
2018	The Naga Pride	Documentary	Editor / Sound Design	Quotes from the earth	
2018	The Naga Pride	Documentary	Editor / Sound Design	11th International Documentary and Short Film Festival of Kerala, Kerala	
2018	The Naga Pride	Documentary	Editor / Sound Design	International Ecological Film Festival Russia	
2018	The Naga Pride	Documentary	Editor / Sound Design	Festival international du film ornithologique de Ménigoute, Ménigoute, France	
2018	The Naga Pride	Documentary	Editor / Sound Design	VIVA Film Festival, Bosnia and Herzegovina	
2018	The Naga Pride	Documentary	Editor / Sound Design	Green Earth Film Festival, California	
2018	The Naga Pride	Documentary	Editor / Sound Design	Nagaon International Short & Documentary Film Festival	
2017	The Return of Sangai	Short Documentary	Director	Kirloskar Vasundhara International Film Festival, Pune	
2017	The Return of Sangai	Short Documentary	Director	India Heritage Walk Festival	
2017	The Return of Sangai	Short Documentary	Director	Kadakam Forest and Environmental; Film Festival, Silent Valley National Park, Palakkad, Kerala	
2017	The Return of Sangai	Short Documentary	Director	Smaragdni Eco Film Festival, Croatia	
2017	The Return of Sangai	Short Documentary	Director	Sangai Festival, Keibul Lamjao National Park, India	
2016	Singalila in the Himalaya	Documentary	Director	CMS Vatavaran Film Festival	
2016	Singalila in the Himalaya	Documentary	Director	Kadakam Forest and Environmental; Film Festival, Silent Valley National Park, Palakkad, Kerala	
2016	Singalila in the Himalaya	Documentary	Director	IMF Mountain Film Festival 2017, Indian Mountaineering Foundation, New Delhi, India	
2016	Singalila in the Himalaya	Documentary	Director	10th International Documentary and Short Film Festival of Kerala, Kerala	
2016	Singalila in the Himalaya	Documentary	Director	16th Girimitra Sammelan, Mumbai	
2016	Singalila in the Himalaya	Documentary	Director	Pokhara International Mountain Film Festival, Pokhara, Nepal	
2016	Kalia : The Lost Gibbon	Short Documentary	Graphics	9th International Documentary and Short Film Festival of Kerala, Kerala	
2015	Eastern Himalaya - Ancient Risks Future Threats	Short Documentary	Graphics	CMS Vatavaran 2015	
2015	Eastern Himalaya - Ancient Risks Future Threats	Short Documentary	Graphics	IMF Mountain Film Festival 2017, Indian Mountaineering Foundation, New Delhi, India	
2015	Eastern Himalaya - Ancient Risks Future Threats	Short Documentary	Graphics	10th Festival Gorniskega Filma	
2014	In To the Darkroom Shortfilm	Short Film			
2012	Goecha La In Search of Kangchenjunga	Documentary	Director		
