= A Way Away =

Studio album by Indica
- Released: June 02, 2010
- Genres: Pop rock, symphonic metal
- Length: 54:02
- Label: Nuclear Blast
- Producer: Tuomas Holopainen

Indica chronology
Valoissa (2008)	A Way Away (2010)	Akvaario/Shine (2014)

A Way Away is the fifth album from Finnish pop rock band Indica. This is the band's first English album and it contains English versions of songs from previous albums. The album was released in many editions such as CD, CD + DVD, Deluxe, Diary and Suitcase editions. The album was produced by Tuomas Holopainen from Nightwish.

== Track listing ==
All music is composed by Jonsu. All lyrics are by Jonsu and Rory Winston, except for "Precious Dark", which are by Tuomas Holopainen.

#	Title	Original title	Music	Lyrics	Length
1	"Islands of Light"	"Vuorien taa"	Jonsu	Jonsu; Rory Winston	3:02
2	"Precious Dark"	"Pidä kädestä"	Jonsu	Tuomas Holopainen	3:49
3	"Children of Frost"	"Hiljainen maa"	Jonsu	Jonsu; Winston	5:20
4	"Lilja's Lament"	"Rannalla"	Jonsu	Jonsu; Winston	5:54
5	"In Passing"	"Valoissa"	Jonsu	Jonsu; Winston	3:43
6	"Scissor Paper Rock"	"Ikuinen virta"	Jonsu	Jonsu; Winston	4:28
7	"A Way Away"	"Nukkuu kedolla"	Jonsu	Jonsu; Winston	5:04
8	"As If"	"Elä"	Jonsu	Jonsu; Winston	3:27
9	"Straight and Arrow"	"Pahinta tänään"	Jonsu	Jonsu; Winston	3:30
10	"Outside In" (bonus track)	"Ulkona"	Jonsu	Jonsu; Winston	3:50
11	"Nursery Crimes" (bonus track)	"Noita"	Jonsu	Jonsu; Winston	3:59
12	"Eerie Eden"	"Vettä vasten"	Jonsu	Jonsu; Winston	7:53
13	"Breathe" (From Precious Dark Single)	"Askeleet"	Jonsu	Jonsu; Winston	4:00
14	"Wuthering Heights" (From Precious Dark Single)		Kate Bush	Kate Bush	3:57

== Critical reception ==
Professional ratings
Review scores
Source	Rating
The Metal Observer	7/10 stars
Sonic Cathedral	8.5/10 stars
The Digital Fix	8/10 stars
The Metal Forge	8/10 stars
Lords of Metal	6.4/10 stars

Critical reception for the album has been mainly positive with particular praise focusing on the vocals of lead singer Jonsu. Sonic Cathedral gave particular praise for the songs Islands of Light and Precious Dark, and concluded that the album was "a great and diverse record". The Digital fix also gave a positive review, calling the album "this is an album of shifting, flowing moods and emotions that grabs you along for a joyous ride". Rocktopia stated "the more I listen to this album, the more it drew me in and I am now a total convert to the band known as Indica".

Teeth of the Divine gave a more negative review of the album, criticizing the production of the album, calling it "polished and bland". Lords of Metal also gave a mixed review, stating that the songs are "peacefully passing by without lighting a flame anywhere.

== Music videos ==
Indica has released four music videos for their first English album A Way Away.

1. "Straight and Arrow" (Winter 2009)
2. "In Passing" (March 2010)
3. "Islands of Light" (June 2010)
4. "Precious Dark" (August 2010)

== Editions of A Way Away ==
Indica has released A Way Away in various editions through Nuclear Blast.

=== CD format ===
The standard CD album edition includes ten tracks from the track list:

1. "Islands of Light"
2. "Precious Dark"
3. "Children of Frost"
4. "Lilja's Lament"
5. "In Passing"
6. "Scissor Paper Rock"
7. "A Way Away"
8. "As If"
9. "Straight and Arrow"
10. "Eerie Eden"

=== Vinyl format ===
Indica has also released A Way Away in vinyl format, which is limited to 1000 copies worldwide. This edition features two vinyls: one beige and one dark red. This edition includes eleven tracks out of twelve.

Beige vinyl, side A:

1. "Islands of Light"
2. "Precious Dark"
3. "Children of Frost"

Beige vinyl, side B:

1. "Lilja's Lament"
2. "In Passing"
3. "Scissor Paper Rock"

Dark red, vinyl side A:

1. "A Way Away"
2. "As If"
3. "Straight and Arrow"

Dark red, vinyl side B:

1. "Nursery Crimes"
2. "Eerie Eden"

=== Diary and Suitcase editions ===
The Diary edition of A Way Away features a digipak CD with eleven tracks and also the A Way Away DVD. This edition also includes a 20 cm x 20 cm Indica diary book titled "Sneak a Peek at My Diary", and a Rebella Pen.

The Suitcase edition of A Way Away is similar to the Diary edition of the album. Its digipak CD features the same eleven tracks as on the Diary edition and also includes a DVD and a "Sneak a Peek at My Diary" book. This edition, however, also includes five photo cards, a lanyard, and a Khol Kajal eyeliner pen. The Suitcase edition is limited to 1000 copies.

The track listing on both Diary and Suitcase editions of the CD album is as follows:

1. "Islands of Light"
2. "Precious Dark"
3. "Children of Frost"
4. "Lilja's Lament"
5. "In Passing"
6. "Scissor Paper Rock"
7. "A Way Away"
8. "As If"
9. "Straight and Arrow"
10. "Eerie Eden"
11. "Outside In"

=== Japanese version ===
The Japanese version was released by Victor Entertainment and features all twelve tracks, including "Outside In" and "Nursery Crimes".

The track listing in the Japanese version of the CD album is as follows:

1. "Islands of Light"
2. "Precious Dark"
3. "Children of Frost"
4. "Lilja's Lament"
5. "In Passing"
6. "Scissor Paper Rock"
7. "A Way Away"
8. "As If"
9. "Straight and Arrow"
10. "Eerie Eden"
11. "Outside In"
12. "Nursery Crimes"

== DVD ==
The DVD for A Way Away was released alongside the album. It is included in Diary and Suitcase editions of the album. It features three music videos from A Way Away as well as other videos including live warm-up videos, acoustic recordings, and outtakes. The DVD also features the first version of "In Passing".

The contents of the DVD are as follows:

- "Welcome - An Introduction by Indica"
- "Islands of Light" (music video)
- "In Passing" (music video)
- "Straight and Arrow" (music video)
- "Scissor, Paper, Rock" (live warm-up show)
- "Straight and Arrow" (live warm-up show)
- "In Passing" (first version)
- "Studio Report"
- "Photo Session"
- "On the Road"
- "Outtakes"

== Personnel ==
- Johanna "Jonsu" Salomaa – vocals, violin, guitars, keyboards
- Heini Säisä – bass guitar, backing vocals
- Sirkku Karvonen – keyboards, melodica, clarinet, harpsichord, grand piano, backing vocals
- Jenny Julia – guitars, backing vocals
- Laura Häkkänen – drums
- Tuomas Holopainen - producer

== Charts ==
Chart (2010)	Peak position
Finnish Albums Chart	8
German Albums Chart	20
Swiss Albums Chart	32
Greek Albums Chart	45
Austrian Albums Chart	52
French Albums Chart	185
