= Cuatrecasas Medal for Excellence in Tropical Botany =

Scientific award

Jose Cuatrecasas Medal for Excellence in Tropical Botany
- Awarded for: significant contribution to advancing the field of tropical botany
- Presented by: Smithsonian National Museum of Natural History, USA
- First award: 2001
- Website: http://botany.si.edu/cuatrecasas/cuatrecasasmedal.cfm

Jose Cuatrecasas Medal for Excellence in Tropical Botany was initiated in 2001 by the Smithsonian National Museum of Natural History, USA. It is named after José Cuatrecasas, a pioneering botanist and taxonomist who worked on the flora of tropical South America. It is awarded annually to a scientist who has made a very significant contribution to advancing the field of tropical botany. Nominations for the award can be made by all in the Botany Department at the museum.

The award is a bronze medal with an image of José Cuatrecasas on one side and the awardee's name and date of presentation on the other.

The awardees are:
2001: Rogers McVaugh a taxonomist of tropical and temperate species particularly Lobeliaceae and Myrtaceae, author of tropical floras for Panama, Guatemala, the Guyana Highlands and Mexico, and biographies of several botanists.
2002: P. Barry Tomlinson specialist in anatomy, morphology and tropical botany, author of books on mangroves, tropical trees, the anatomy of monocotyledons and with inspirational commitment to teaching students about the tropics.
2003: John Beaman long-time curator of the Michigan State University Herbarium, and especially for his work on the floras of Mexico and northern Borneo and the taxonomy Asteraceae.
2004: David John Mabberley for his work with the tropical genera Chisocheton (Meliaceae) and Grewia, on pachycaul trees and his authorship of several important books.
2005: Joint award to Jerzy Rzedowski and Graciela Calderón de Rzedowski for both their individual and joint contributions to tropical botany, especially of Mexico, including their regional floras and work on the genus Bursera (Burseraceae).
2006: Sherwin Carlquist, a wood anatomist especially of tropical angiosperm families who also worked on evolution of plants on islands.
2007: No award
2008: Mireya Correa, Director of the Herbarium of the University of Panama, for work on plant systematics, especially the flora of Panama, an educator and administrator.
2009: Norris H. Williams for his work on neotropical Orchidaceae that includes molecular phylogenetics, the chemistry of floral fragrances, and pollination biology that has advanced understanding of orchid evolution and insect pollinators.
2010: Beryl B. Simpson for work on the phylogeny and biogeography of several angiosperm groups (especially Krameriaceae, Polylepis (Rosaceae) and Perezia (Asteraceae)), primarily from the American Southwest, Mexico, and Central and South America.
2011: No award
2012: Walter S Judd for his research, field work, and teaching, especially his work with the Ericaceae, Melastomataceae, and Miconeae. Along with co-authors he has written Plant Systematics: A Phylogenetic Approach, one of the most widely used university-level text books in phylogenetics.
2013: Ana Maria Giulietti Harley for her research and field work especially of Eriocaulaceae and the flora of Brazil.
2014: H. Peter Linder for contributions to the systematics, biogeography, and evolution of Orchidaceae, Restionaceae, and Poaceae as well as work on identifying biogeographical patterns in the Southern Hemisphere and especially in Africa.
2015: Paulo Günter Windisch for his work on systematics, biogeography, and evolution of neotropical pteridophytes, and also for educating and mentoring university students in Brazil.
2016: Kamaljit S Bawa for his work on tropical biology and international conservation, especially reproductive ecology and population genetics in both the Old and New World tropics. He is the founder of the Ashoka Trust for Research in Ecology and the Environment.
2017: Robin B. Foster for work on cataloging the flora of Barro Colorado Island in Panama and then developing the first of a network of tropical forest dynamics plots that has advanced study of tropical ecosystems and theories for their function and high biodiversity.
2018: Alan K. Graham for his work on understanding the origins and history of neotropical floras that has made particular use of pollen and microfossils.
2019: Sandra D Knapp tropical botanist and educator, advocate for conserving biodiversity, floristics, collections, the relationships between plants and people and particularly for her work with the Solanaceae.
2020:
2021: Sebsebe Demissew for his life's work in conserving and recording the very diverse Ethiopian flora with many endemic species, and leadership of the Ethiopian Flora Project and the National Herbarium.
2022: Fabián A. Michelangeli for research on the systematics and taxonomy of Melastomataceae, ant-plant interactions and the floristics of the Guayana Highlands.
2023: Rafaela Campostrini Forzza from the University of São Paulo, Brazil, botanical collector, taxonomist and curator.
