= Sangeetha Kadur =

Sangeetha Kadur is an Indian artist from Bangalore, India. Her illustrations have been published in several field guides, wildlife books, and magazines. The Hummingbird book, for Gorgas Science Foundation for which she has contributed artworks, has been acclaimed worldwide.

Sangeetha Kadur is also the co-founder of GreenScraps, a Nature Journaling workshop for children, she is one of the creative directors of Felis Creations. She is the sister of wildlife cameraman Sandesh Kadur.

== Education ==
After her schooling, she has completed graduation from Karnataka Chitrakala Parishath, Bangalore.

== Career ==
After her graduation, Kadur started as a wildlife artist, contributing to educational books. As soon as she graduated from art college, her work assignment was to create a wildlife mural on a wall spanning 10 x 15 feet (3 x 4.5 metres). She was recognized internationally when one of her paintings appeared in the documentary Mountains of the Monsoons by the BBC Natural World Series. She has contributed to more than hundred wildlife books and field-guides.

Kadur's recent work has focused on trees.

== Books ==
Kadur was an illustrator for:

- Hummingbirds (2016) ISBN 978-1-61584-514-9
- Every Tree Counts! (2017) ISBN 978-93-86721-22-8
- Wildlife in a City Pond (2019) ISBN 978-81-8479-539-4

== Initiatives ==
- Neralu—Bengaluru Tree Festival
- GreenScraps, a Nature Journaling workshop for children
