= Kamaljit Bawa =

Indian evolutionary ecologist and conservation biologist (1939 -)

Kamal Bawa
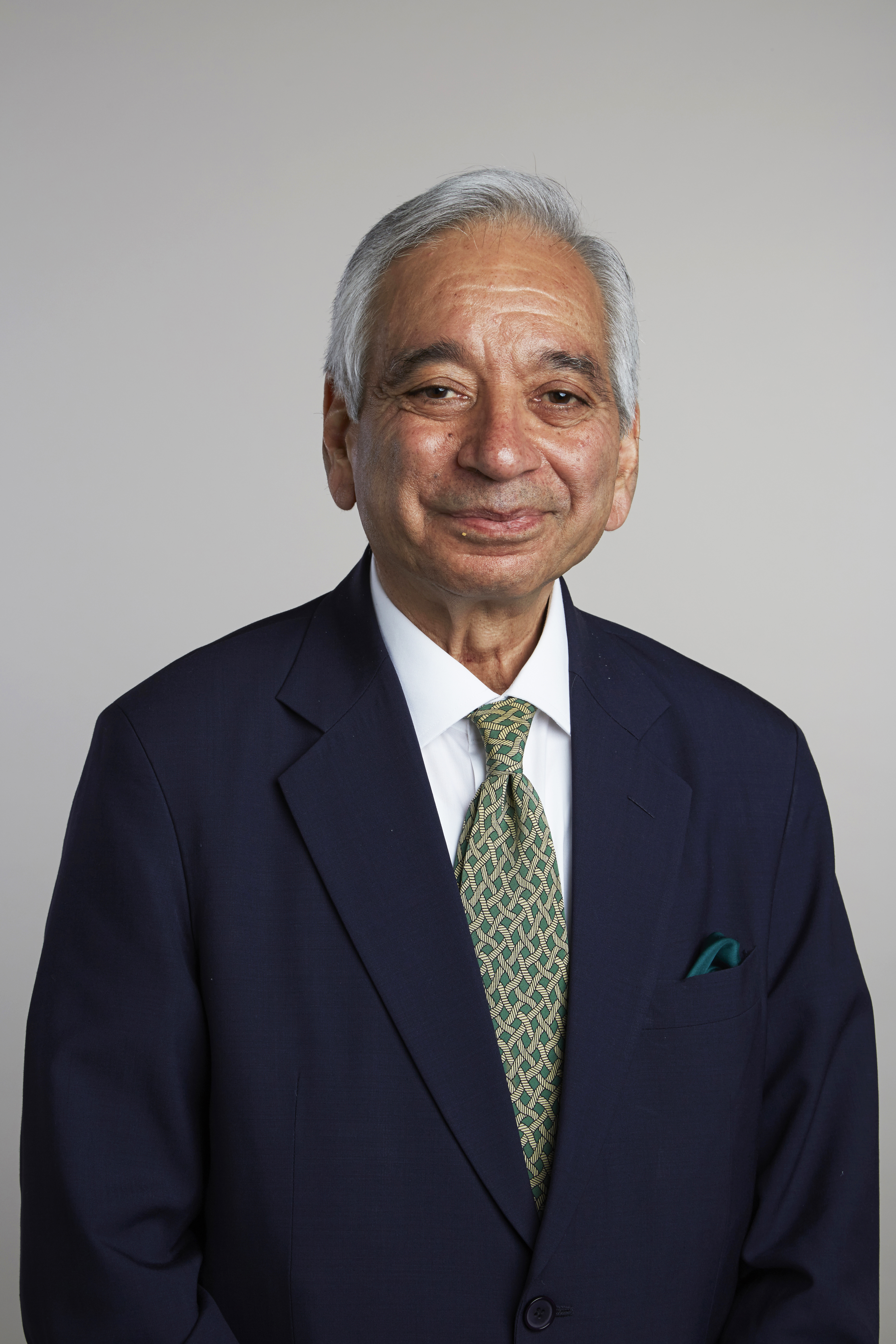
- Kamaljit Singh Bawa at the Royal Society admissions day in London, July 2015
- Born: Kamaljit Singh Bawa; 7 April 1939 (age 87)
- Education: Panjab University, Chandigarh
- Awards: Fellow of the Royal Society (2015); MIDORI Prize (2014)
- Scientific career
- Fields: Ecology
- Website: kbawa.com

Kamaljit Singh Bawa, FRS (born 7 April 1939 in Punjab, India) is an evolutionary ecologist, conservation biologist and a distinguished professor of Biology at the University of Massachusetts, Boston. He is also the founder of Ashoka Trust for Research in Ecology and the Environment. In 2012, Bawa received the first Gunnerus Sustainability Award, the world's major international award for work on sustainability. He is an elected member of the American Academy of Arts and Sciences. He was elected a Member of the American Philosophical Society in 2019.

== Academic career ==
Bawa received B.S., M.S., and PhD degrees from Panjab University, Chandigarh, India. After receiving his PhD in 1967, he came to the United States as a postdoctoral research associate and instructor at College of Forest Resources, University of Washington. He received the Maria Moors Cabot and the Charles Bullard Research Fellowships at Harvard University in 1972 and worked as a research fellow at the Grey Herbarium, Harvard University from 1973 to 1974. In 1974, he joined the Department of Biology, at University of Massachusetts, Boston as an assistant professor. He was promoted to associate professor in 1977 and to full professor in 1981 and became a distinguished professor in Biology in 1996 at the Department of Biology at University of Massachusetts, Boston.

== Accolades and institutional affiliations ==
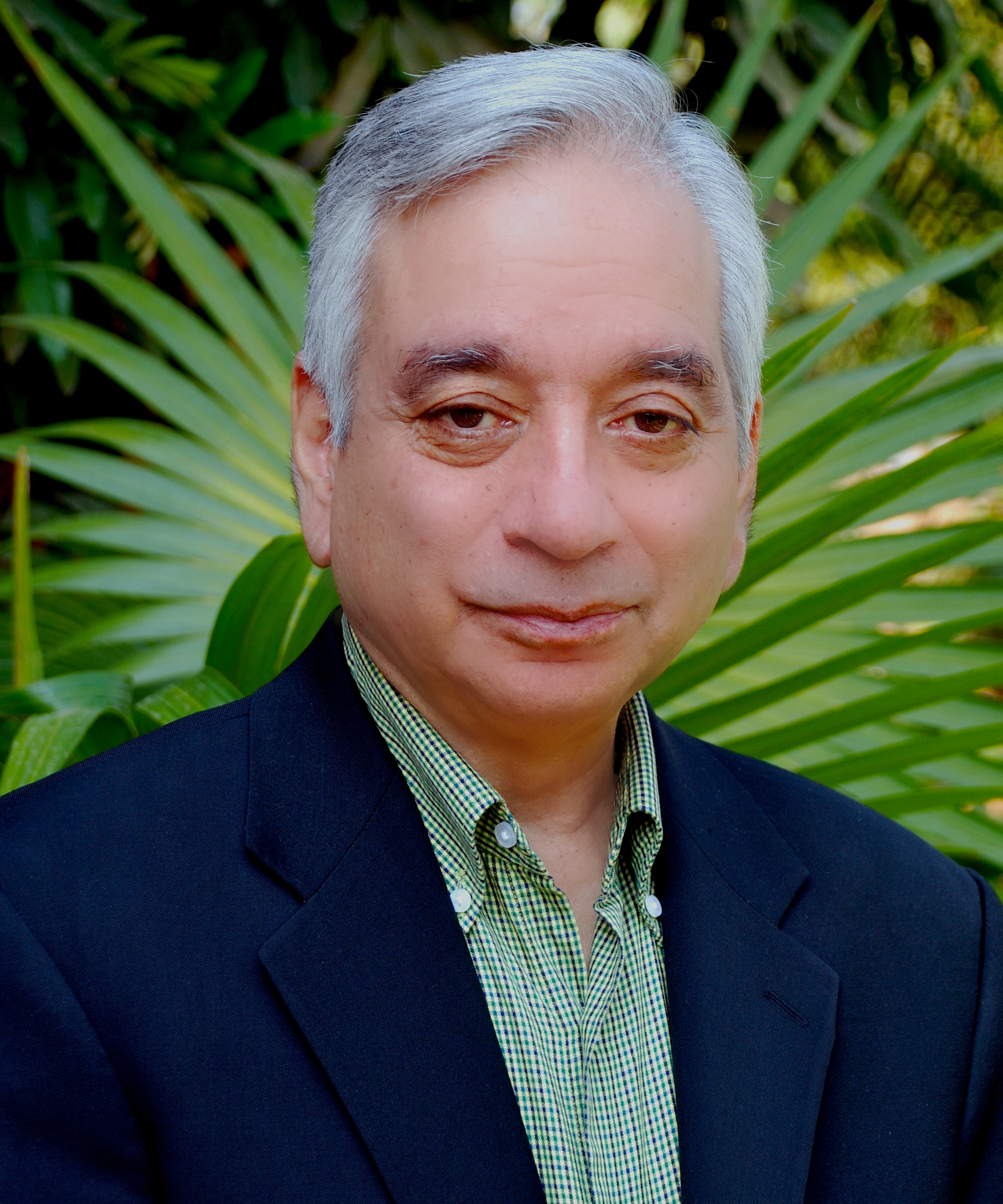
Kamal Bawa, 2012

Along with First Gunnerus Sustainability Award, Bawa is a recipient of the highest awards from the two main professional societies in his field.

In 2003, the Association for Tropical Biology and Conservation bestowed on him its highest honour by electing him as an Honorary Fellow. The Society for Conservation Biology awarded him its Distinguished Service Award in 2009. He also received P.N. Mehra Memorial Award in Botany in 2007.

Bawa has been a Guggenheim Fellow from 1987 to 1988 as well as a Pew Scholar in Conservation and the Environment from 1991 to 1996, a Giorgio Ruffolo Visiting Scholar in Sustainability Science in the Sustainability Science Program at Harvard's Center for International Development, and a Bullard Fellow at the Harvard Forest in 1972, and again in 2009. He was an elected fellow for The National Academy of Sciences, India and the American Association for the Advancement of Science (AAAS), American Academy of Arts and Sciences, and the Royal Norwegian Society of Letters and Sciences.

He served on NSF Advisory Panel on Conservation and Restoration Biology in 1991 and on population biology in 1993, 1994. He has also been a member of the Science Committee, DIVERSITAS-agrobiodiversity Group since 2006. He also serves on the advisory boards of Conabio, Natureserve, TEAM Program of Conservation International, William L. Brown Center of the Missouri Botanical Garden. He is a member of the Board of Trustees of S M Sehgal Foundation, previously named the Institute of Rural Research and Development (IRRAD), the Foundation for Revitalization of Local Health Traditions, and the Committee for Research and Exploration of the National Geographic Society.

Bawa is the president of the Ashoka Trust for Research in Ecology and Environment (ATREE), a non-governmental organisation devoted to research, policy analysis, and education in India, member of the governing boards of the Institute of Ayurveda and Integrative Medicine, and Village Forward.

== Awards and honors ==
In 2012 Bawa received the international Gunnerus Sustainability Award, presented by the Royal Norwegian Society of Science and Letters.

Bawa was elected as a Fellow of the Royal Society (FRS) in 2015.

In 2016, he was awarded the Jose Cuatrecasas Medal for Excellence in Tropical Botany.

== Publications ==
Bawa has authored more than 180 academic papers, author or editor of ten books, monographs or special issues of journals including Sahayadris: India’s Western Ghats – A Vanishing Heritage. He is the editor-in-chief of Conservation and Society, an interdisciplinary journal in conservation; associate editor of Ecology and Society; and academic editor of PLoS ONE. He is a member of the editorial board of Journal of Sustainable Forestry. He was an associate editor of Conservation Biology from 1987 to 1993. He served on the editorial board of Journal of Arnold Arboretum from 1986 to 1990, Journal of Tree Science from 1986 to 1991, and Evolutionary Trends in Plants from 1987 to 1992.

== Books ==
- Himalaya: Mountains of Life
