= Himalaya: Mountains of Life =

Book about the biodiversity of the Eastern Himalayas

Himalaya : Mountains of Life
- Cover
- Editor: Priya Singh
- Author: Kamaljit S. Bawa, Sandesh Kadur
- Translator: Priya Singh, Reinmar Seidler
- Illustrator: George Thengummoottil
- Language: English
- Genre: Coffee Table Book
- Publisher: Ashoka Trust for Research in Ecology and the Environment
- Publication date: 11 February 2013
- Publication place: India
- Media type: Print (Hardbound color)
- Pages: 312 pp (first edition)
- ISBN: 1615845127

Himalaya: Mountains of Life is a coffee table book authored by Sandesh Kadur and Kamaljit S. Bawa. The book contains information about the biodiversity of the Eastern Himalayas and is divided into four main chapters, The Land, The People, The Animals, The Plants.

The book aims at capturing the biodiversity and the culture of the eastern Himalayan region by documenting behaviors and rarely photographed species. It is a sequel to Sahyadris, India’s Western Ghats.
