= Hummingbirds (book) =

- Author: John C. Arvin
- Illustrator: Raul Andrade, Vydhehi Kadur, Sangeetha Kadur
- Cover artist: Raul Andrade
- Language: English
- Subject: Birding
- Genre: Coffee Table Book
- Publisher: Gorgas Science Foundation, Felis Creations
- Publication date: 2016
- Publication place: United States of America
- Pages: 216
- ISBN: 978-1-61584-514-9
- Website: http://www.hummingbirdsoftheworld.com

Hummingbirds is a large format, fine art book coffee table book about hummingbirds written by John C. Arvin, with 212 illustrations of hummingbirds in their habitat, and published in 2016. The book is published by Gorgas Science Foundation in the United States of America and Felis Creations in India.

The illustrations were painted by three wildlife artists: Sangeetha Kadur, Raul Andrade, and Vydhehi Kadur. Sangeetha Kadur from India is the sister of the wildlife filmmaker Sandesh Kadur.

The first volume showcases the 127 species of hummingbirds found throughout North America, Central America, and the Caribbean Islands.
