= Liu Jianguo =

Liu Jianguo (刘建国; 劉建國) is a human name, may refer to:

- Jianguo Liu (born 1963), Chinese American ecologist
- Liu Chien-kuo (born 1969), Taiwanese politician
