= Indica (Finnish band) =

Finnish pop rock band

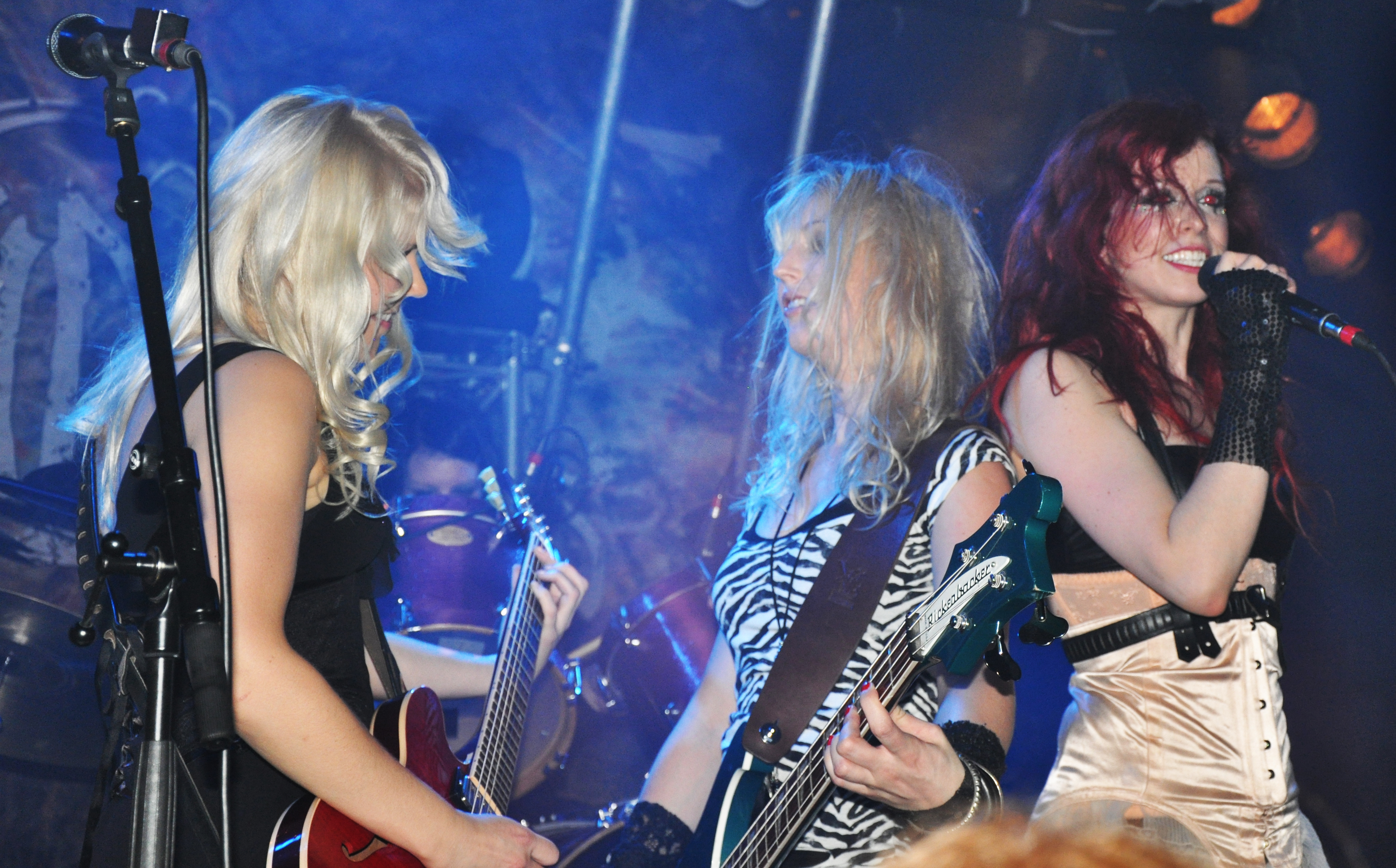
- Indica performing in 2010

Background information
- Origin: Helsinki, Finland
- Genres: Pop rock, alternative rock, symphonic metal
- Years active: 2001–present
- Labels: Sony BMG (2002–2009); Nuclear Blast (2009–present); Suomen (2013–present)
- Members: Johanna "Jonsu" Salomaa; Heini Säisä; Sirkku Karvonen; Laura Häkkänen
- Past members: Jenny Julia

Indica is a Finnish pop rock band founded in 2001. Jani Jalonen of Sony Music became interested in the group, and a recording contract was signed 2003. Indica's first album, Ikuinen virta was released in 2004. It has since sold platinum in Finland.

Indica supported Nightwish during their Scandinavian tour 2007 in which they performed English versions of their songs. Tuomas Holopainen of Nightwish produced their next album, Valoissa, while many of the songs employed the orchestral talents of Pip Williams and the literary talents of their lyrics collaborator Rory Winston. The band was also added to the line-up for Nightwish's second half of the Dark Passion Play Tour with Pain.

== History ==
Indica was founded in 2001 by Johanna Salomaa (nicknamed "Jonsu"; vocals, violin), Heini Säisä (bass), Sirkku Karvonen (keyboards), Jenny Julia Mandelin (guitar) and Laura Häkkänen (drums). Before this, the girls had already spent their entire childhood surrounded by classical music and had also played in a few different band line-ups. During Christmas 2002, Indica signed a management contract with Peter Kokljuschin and in 2003 a record deal with SonyMusic, leading to Indica starting work on their debut album.

The album was co-produced by Gabi Hakanen and Erno Laitinen, and from here began the journey of Indica and Erno together which took them through three albums. The platinum-selling debut album Ikuinen virta was released in 2004, and from this album the title track as well as the song Scarlett were released as singles. Indica's second record Tuuliset tienoot was released in the Autumn of 2005 and went on to sell over 20,000 discs, and the third album Kadonnut puutarha was released in spring 2007.

Indica's music and lyrics are written by the band's singer Jonsu, who started her composer's career even before she went to school, writing little 'symphonies' two bars long. Jonsu has explained that, to her, the biggest inspirational source for writing music is the music from movies. The lyrics stem from her own life, the lives of her friends, and also from dreams.

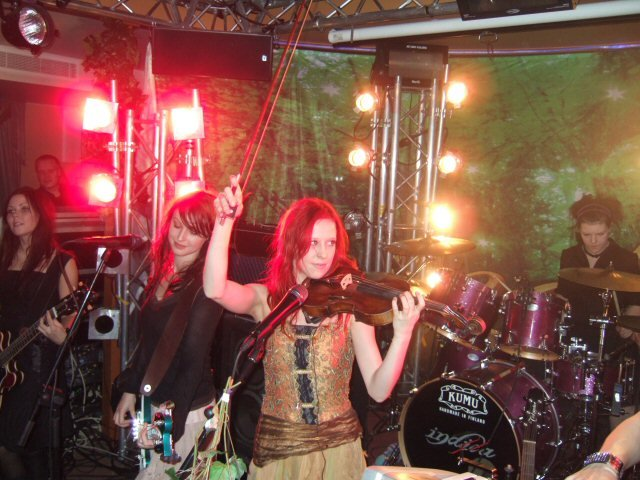
Indica in 2006

Indica, known for their playful and lively stage presence and their distinctive music, went travelling outside Finland near the close of 2007 when they performed as the support act for Nightwish during their Scandinavian tour. Indica were well received in the other Nordic countries. A tight collaboration between Indica and Nightwish frontman Tuomas Holopainen started on this tour, aimed at creating the next album. Tuomas was the producer of the fourth Indica longplayer, released autumn 2008 and titled Valoissa ('In the Lights'). The first single Pahinta tänään ('Worst of Today') was released on 8 May 2008, followed by Valoissa in August 2008, and 10 h myöhässä ('10 Hours Late') in January, all with accompanying music videos.

=== A Way Away (2010) ===
A compilation album called Pahinta tänään: Kokoelma, was released in Finland on 21 October 2009, and contains old tracks, along with four new or unreleased ones. One of these unreleased songs is Valokeilojen vampyyri (translated on their webpage as 'Vampire in the Light Beams', though more accurately translated as 'Limelight Vampire'). This is an old Indica song which was played at a few gigs in 2004, and Indica said it would never be heard again. This song is also their last single, and a video has been made, with the theme of Indica's early days.

The band's first English album, A Way Away, was released 2 June 2010. It is a CD of English reinterpretations of some previously published compositions. Some that have been rewritten are Pahinta tänään, Noita ('Witch') from Kadonnut puutarha ('The Lost Garden'), and Vuorien taa ('Beyond the Mountains') from Tuuliset tienoot ('Windy Shires'), which was rewritten as Siren Song. A short piece can be found on their website, and on live performances on YouTube, along with a few other English versions. The song was altered for the album and renamed Islands of Light. A Way Away includes production by Tuomas Holopainen, as well as collaboration on all lyrics by the poet and screenwriter Rory Winston, as well as orchestration by Pip Williams. Two videos have been recorded in Tokyo for this English album by the French photographer Denis Goria (Nightwish, Pain, Amorphis, Hypocrisy, Naked, Tarot, The Hellacopters, etc.). The original Finnish songs that have been remade in English are Pahinta tänään, renamed Straight and Arrow, and Valoissa as In Passing. The videos for both are available on YouTube.

=== Akvaario/Shine and departure of Jenny Julia (2014) ===
In autumn of 2013, the band announced the release of new material. On 29 November 2013, the band released a new Finnish single, "Älä kanna pelkoa". On 24 January 2014, they released a new album called Akvaario (Aquarium). The album was simultaneously published in English with the title Shine. The first single from Shine, "A Definite Maybe", was released on 6 December 2013.

On 15 October 2014, guitarist Jenny left the band.

=== Possible upcoming album ===
On 22 August 2017, Indica posted a picture on their official Facebook page of the band in the studio, with the caption, "Here we go again!". This had led to speculation that the band may have a new album in the works. As of January 2023, no further announcements were made about new music.

On 16 March 2023, the band announced that its 8-year break would end, and a new single "Year 95" would be released on 24 March 2023.

== Members ==
Current

- Johanna "Jonsu" Salomaa – lead vocals, violin, rhythm guitar, keyboards
- Heini Säisä – bass, backing vocals
- Sirkku Karvonen – keyboards, clarinet, backing vocals
- Laura Häkkänen – drums, studio backing vocals

Former

- Jenny Mandelin – lead guitar, backing vocals (2001–2014)

== Discography ==
=== Studio albums ===
Year	Title	Peak chart positions						Certifications
Year	Title	FIN	GER	AUT	SWI	FRA	GRE	Certifications
2004	Ikuinen virta ('The Eternal Stream'): Released: 16 August 2004; Label: Sony BMG Finland	4	—	—	—	—	—	FIN: Gold; FIN: Platinum
2005	Tuuliset tienoot ('Windy Shires'): Released: 26 October 2005; Label: Sony BMG Finland	12	—	—	—	—	—	FIN: Gold
2007	Kadonnut puutarha ('The Lost Garden'): Released: 21 March 2007; Label: Sony BMG Finland	8	—	—	—	—	—	
2008	Valoissa ('In The Lights'): Released: 17 September 2008; Label: Sony BMG Finland	3	—	—	—	—	—	
2010	A Way Away: Released: 2 June 2010; Label: Nuclear Blast	8	20	52	32	185	45	
2014	Shine: Released: 24 January 2014; Label: Nuclear Blast	—	99	—	—	—	—	
2014	Akvaario ('Aquarium'): Released: 24 January 2014; Label: KHY Suomen Musiikki Oy	3	—	—	—	—	—	
"—" Album did not chart.

=== Compilations ===
- Pahinta tänään - Kokoelma (2009)

=== Singles ===
- "Scarlett" (26 March 2004)
- "Ikuinen virta" (5 August 2004)
- "Vettä vasten" (23 March 2005)
- "Ihmisen lento" – Promo (2005)
- "Vuorien taa" + "Nuorallatanssija" (19 October 2005)
- "Pidä kädestä" – Promo (2005)
- "Niin tuleni teen" – Promo (2005)
- "Linnansa vanki" – Promo (2007)
- "Noita" – Promo (2007)
- "Ulkona" – Promo (2007)
- "Pahinta tänään" – Promo (8 May 2008), Internet single (12 May 2008)
- "Valoissa" (August 2008)
- "10 h myöhässä" (14 November 2008)
- "Valokeilojen vampyyri" (Autumn 2009)
- "In Passing" (4 June 2010)
- "Precious Dark" (10 September 2010)
- "A Definite Maybe" (22 November 2013)
- "Älä kanna pelkoa" (29 November 2013)

=== Music videos ===
- "Scarlett" (2004), directed by Kusti Manninen
- "Ikuinen virta" (2005), directed by Kusti Manninen
- "Vuorien taa" (2006), directed by Marko Mäkilaakso
- "Pidä kädestä" (2006), directed by Marko Mäkilaakso
- "Linnansa vanki" (2007), directed by Jesse Hietanen
- "Pahinta tänään" (Spring 2008), directed by Jesse Hietanen
- "Valoissa" (Autumn 2008)
- "10 h myöhässä" (Christmas 2008)
- "Valokeilojen vampyyri" (Autumn 2009)
- "Straight and Arrow" (Winter 2009), directed by Denis Goria
- "In Passing" (March 2010)
- "Islands of Light" (June 2010)
- "Precious Dark" (August 2010)
- "Älä kanna pelkoa" (December 2013)
- "Suunta on vain ylöspäin" (March 2014)

=== Collaborations ===
- "Erämaan viimeinen" (Last of the Wilds) (Nightwish)
- "Sydänten tiellä" (Jonsu & Jukka Poika)
- "Bridge of Memories" (Jonsu & Pale Saarinen)
