= Conservation and Society =

- Discipline: Ecology, political ecology
- Language: English
- Edited by: Kamaljit Bawa

Publication details
- History: 2003–present
- Publisher: Medknow Publications on behalf of the Ashoka Trust for Research in Ecology and the Environment (India)
- Frequency: Quarterly
- Open access: Yes
- License: Creative Commons Attribution
- Impact factor: 1.8 (2025)

Standard abbreviations
- ISO 4: Conserv. Soc.

Indexing
- ISSN: 0972-4923 (print); 0975-3133 (web)
- LCCN: 2004325663
- OCLC no.: 53199607

Links
- Journal homepage; Online access; Online archive

Conservation and Society is a quarterly open-access peer-reviewed academic journal covering political ecology, human–wildlife conflicts, decentralised conservation, conservation policy, ecosystem structure and functioning, systematics, community and species ecology, behavioural ecology, landscape ecology, restoration ecology, and conservation biology. The editor-in-chief is Kamaljit Bawa (University of Massachusetts Amherst). The journal was established in 2003 and published biannually until 2005 by Medknow Publications on behalf of the Ashoka Trust for Research in Ecology and the Environment.

== Abstracting and indexing ==
The journal is abstracted and indexed in:

- Aquatic Sciences and Fisheries Abstracts
- EBSCO databases
- ProQuest databases
- Scopus
- Social Sciences Citation Index

According to the Journal Citation Reports, the journal has a 2025 impact factor of 1.8.
