= Alfaz-e-Mewat =

Community radio station in India

CR Connect
- Abbreviation: CR Connect
- Formation: 28 February 2012; 14 years ago
- Type: Community Radio
- Purpose: Provide a voice to rural communities on development issues and promote local culture.
- Headquarters: Agriculture Research Station, SKNAU, Village Naugaon, Alwar District, Rajasthan

CR Connect FM 107.8 (previously known as Alfaz-e-Mewat) is a community radio station established in 2012 by a rural development NGO, S M Sehgal Foundation, with seed funding from the Ministry of Agriculture, Government of India, under its Agricultural Technology Management Agency scheme. In September 2023, the community radio station relocated to Naugaon in Alwar district, Rajasthan. The radio station broadcasts in parts of Mewat (Firozpur-Jhirka and Nagina blocks) in Haryana and parts of Alwar (Ramgarh Block) in Rajasthan, reaching about 300 villages.

Villagers, schoolchildren, and local artists participate in radio programs and interviews. Community members manage the station as technicians, producers, and facilitators. In areas without radio signals, villagers listen and participate by calling a toll-free number.

== Listener Community ==
CR Connect originally served only the Mewat region of Haryana, now called Nuh, which has been identified by the Ministry of Minority Affairs as a "minority-concentrated backward district." Because rural areas face problems in basic areas such as water availability, agricultural production, health, literacy, and awareness about government entitlements and services, community radio bridges the information divide in these local communities, assisting in rural development, and showcasing cultural heritage. Because women are often isolated at home in these rural communities, community radio provides "a window to the outside world" and a tool for empowering women and girls. Spreading the broadcast area to Naugaon, located in Ramgarh Tehsil of Alwar district, Rajasthan, added a total of 1,945 new Hindu, Meo-Muslim, and Sikh listener families.

== Programs ==
CR Connect FM 107.8 broadcasts 13 hours a day, seven days a week. Information and communications technologies increase program reach to 20 kilometers in and over 40 kilometers outside the immediate geographic coverage area. Narrowcasting collects program feedback and facilitates community dialogue. Live streaming, mobile apps, and podcasts provide program content access to and from anywhere worldwide.

- Villagers hear about and discuss best practices in water management and conservation, health and sanitation, education, agriculture, environmental awareness, and local participation.
- Awareness campaigns and programs discuss social issues that affect citizens.
- Oral folklore, poetry, music, and storytelling programs showcase the area's cultural heritage, history, and people.
- Women broadcasters invite women to take part in conversations about local issues.
- Educational programs that cater to children include Dainik Jeevan Me Vigyan, the show focuses on topics of science in daily life.
- In daily interviews, experts and others share their experiences and achievements from varied walks of life.
- Listeners' needs are shared with government administrative services.
- Programming is shared with other community radio stations.

== Awards and Recognitions ==
- CR Connect (earlier known as Alfaz-e-Mewat) won the Manthan Award for community broadcasting in 2015.
- CR Connect founder representative Pooja O. Murada coauthored the book, Community Radio in India, with Dr. R Sreedher, published by Aakar and supported by the UNESCO New Delhi Cluster Office.
- Third prize winner in the National Awards for Community Radio, 2019 edition.
- Sandvik India Gender Awards for gender programming on community radio Connect in 2019.
- Second place winner for the Sustainability Model Award in the 8th Community Radio Stations award in 2021.
- CR Connect FM 107.8 was awarded the national award for its sustainability model by the Ministry of Information and Broadcasting, Government of India in July 2023.
