= Nilgiris - A Shared Wilderness =

- Directed by: Sandesh Kadur
- Written by: Sandesh Kadur
- Produced by: Rohini Nilekani
- Narrated by: Susheela Raman
- Cinematography: Sandesh Kadur; Robin Darius Conz; Nakul Raj; Sameer Jain; Nikhil Virdi
- Edited by: Pranav Narang; Varun Manavazhi; Robin Darius Conz
- Music by: Susheela Raman; Sam Mills; Neel Adhikari
- Production company: Felis Films
- Distributed by: Dheeraj Films
- Release dates: 4 November 2024 (Chennai); 20 November 2024 (Bangalore)
- Running time: 75 minutes
- Country: India
- Languages: English, Tamil

Nilgiris - A Shared Wilderness is a 2025 Indian nature documentary film directed by Sandesh Kadur , Produced by Rohini Nilekani and Narrated by Susheela Raman. The film features Nilgiri Mountains, India's first UNESCO Biosphere Reserve. The film is a co-production between Felis Films and Rohini Nilekani Philanthropies. The film was certified "U" by the Central Board of Film Certification and was released theatrically on 18 July 2025 by Dheeraj Films. The film was also screened at various venues across India.

== Synopsis ==
Nilgiris is India's first Biosphere Reserve known for sacred rivers, waterfalls and deep gorges including Moyar River Gorge. The Nilgiris Reserve encompasses the largest network of protected areas in the India.

The documentary emphasises the effect of human intervention on nature, including colonial plantations, the Nilgiri Mountain Railway, and the expanding town of Ooty. It also covers the wilderness still remaining in: herds of gaur, leopard cubs dart among tea bushes, and packs of dholes. The documentary has stated its aim as showcasing the fragile balance between human and nature that has lasted in the multiple generations.

== Production ==
Principal photography commenced in July 2022 across Tamil Nadu, Karnataka and Kerala. Post-production took place between September and October 2024 at Films@59 in Bristol, UK. Sound design and mixing were done at Wounded Buffalo in Bristol, UK.

== Release ==
Nilgiris - A Shared Wilderness was premiered at the National Film Development Corporation Tagore Film Centre in Chennai on 4 November 2024. After several private and public screening at various cities across India, the film was theatrically released on 18 July 2025 at more than 45 screens across India.

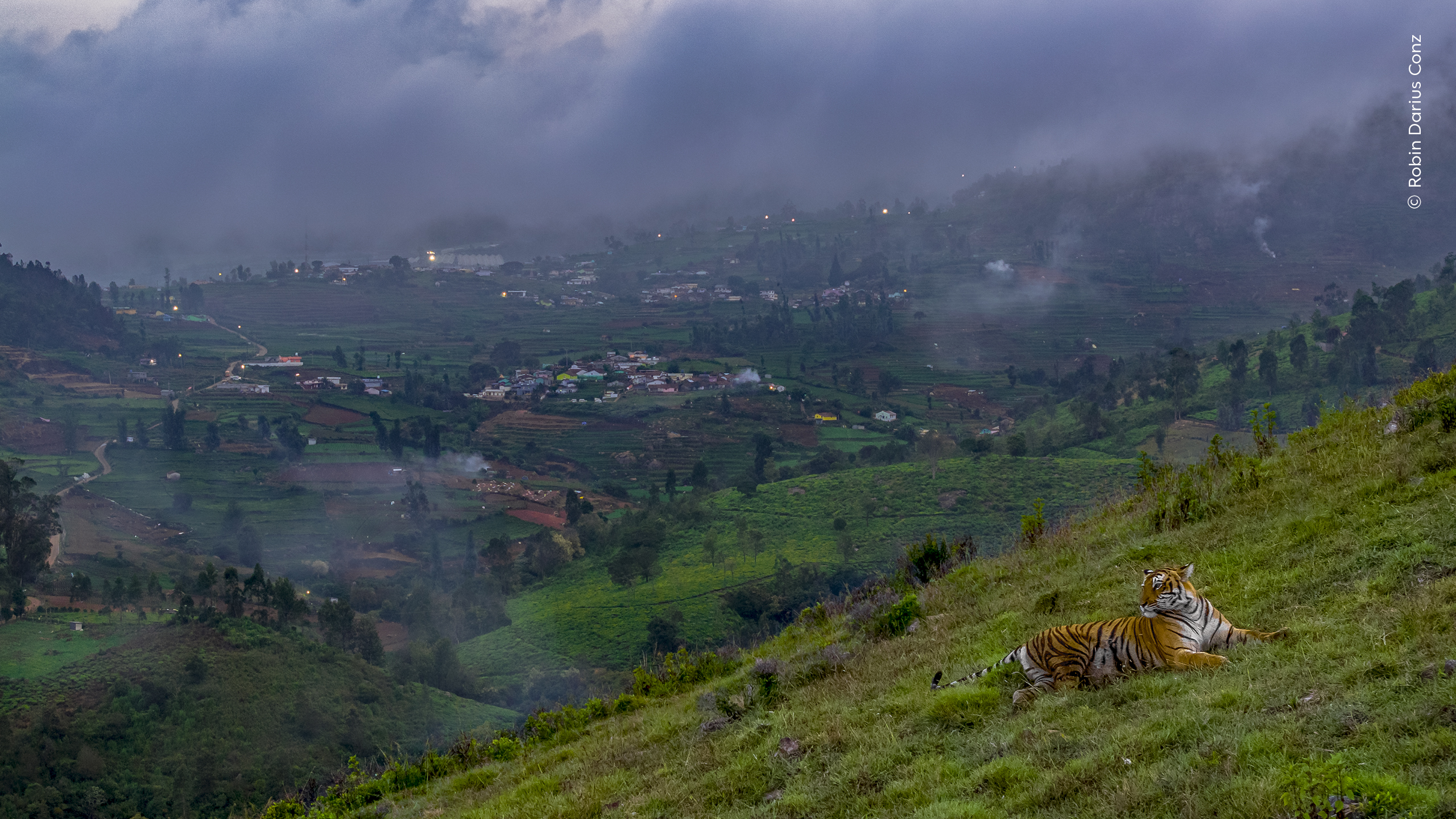
Cinematographer Robin Darius Conz received the 60th Wildlife Photographer of the Year Award from the Natural History Museum London, in the Urban Wildlife category for Photograph "Tiger in Town", featuring a tiger on the hillside captured during the filming of Nilgiris – A Shared Wilderness.

== Film festivals ==
Year	Festival	Award
	Jackson wild	Best sound
2025	World Film Festival in Cannes	Best Nature/Wildlife Film Best Indian Film
2025	WorldFest-Houston International Film Fest	Best Documentary
2025	Festival de Cine Santiago Wild	Natural History (Nominee)
2025	56th International Film Festival of India in Indian Panorama, Non-feature Films section.	
