= Valoissa =

Studio album by Indica
- Released: 2008
- Genre: Pop rock, symphonic metal
- Length: 43:17
- Label: Sony BMG Finland
- Producer: Tuomas Holopainen

Indica chronology
Kadonnut puutarha (2007)	Valoissa (2008)	A Way Away (2010)

Valoissa is the fourth album of the Finnish band Indica and was released in 2008. It was produced by Tuomas Holopainen.

== Track listing ==
1. "Elä" ("Live") - 3:24
2. "Pahinta tänään" ("Worst of Today") - 3:24
3. "10 h myöhässä" ("Ten Hours Late") - 3:40
4. "Hiljainen maa" ("Quiet Land") - 4:54
5. "Askeleet" ("Steps") - 4:04
6. "Sanoja" ("Words") - 3:13
7. "Valoissa" ("In The Lights") - 4:07
8. "Täältä pois" ("Away From Here") - 3:41
9. "Pyromaani" ("Pyromaniac") - 3:37
10. "Hämärää" ("Murk") - 4:16
11. "Ei enää" ("No More") - 6:57
