= Biosand filter =

Water filtration technique based on slow sand filters

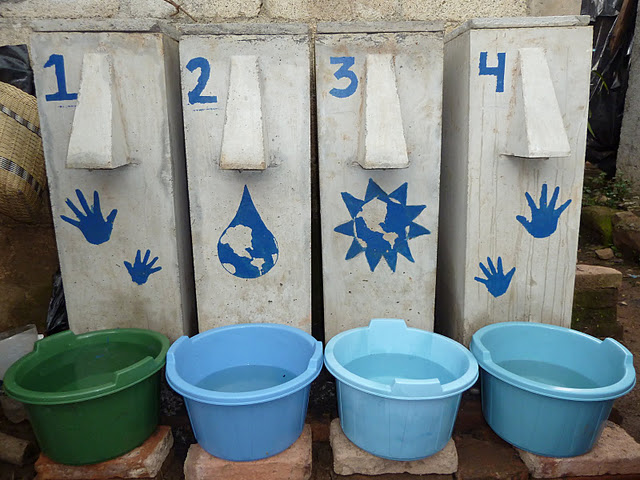
Biosand filters implemented in Socorro, Guatemala by Engineers Without Borders from the University of Illinois: Urbana-Champaign.

A biosand filter (BSF) is a point-of-use water treatment system adapted from traditional slow sand filters. Biosand filters remove pathogens and suspended solids from water using biological and physical processes that take place in a sand column covered with a biofilm. BSFs have been shown to remove heavy metals, turbidity, bacteria, viruses and protozoa. BSFs also reduce discoloration, odor and unpleasant taste. Studies have shown a correlation between use of BSFs and a decrease in the occurrence of diarrhea. Because of their effectiveness, ease of use, and lack of recurring costs, biosand filters are often considered appropriate technology in developing countries. It is estimated that over 200,000 BSFs are in use worldwide.

== History ==
The household biosand filter was proposed by Dr. David Manz in the late 1980s at the University of Calgary, Canada. The system was developed from the slow sand filter, a technology that has been used for drinking water purification since the 1800s. Initial lab and field tests were conducted in 1991; the system was patented in 1993 and was implemented in the field in Nicaragua. The Canadian non-profit company Center for Affordable Water and Sanitation Technology (CAWST) was co-founded in 2001 by David Manz and Camille Dow Baker to promote education and training in water purification and sanitation including using this technology, and to continue developing it.

== Biosand filter components ==
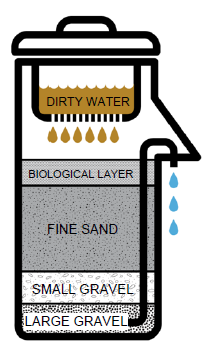
Basic Diagram of a Concrete BioSand Filter.

Biosand filters are typically constructed from concrete or plastic. At the top of the filter, a tightly fitted lid prevents contamination and unwanted pests from entering the filter. Below this, the diffuser plate prevents disturbance of the biofilm when water is poured into the filter. Water then travels through the sand column, which removes pathogens and suspended solids. Below the sand column, a layer of gravel prevents sand from entering the drainage layer and clogging the outlet tube. Below the separating layer is the drainage layer consisting of coarser gravel that prevents clogging near the base of the outlet tube.

== Filtration process ==
Pathogens and suspended solids are removed by biological and physical processes that take place in the biolayer and the sand layer. These processes include:

- Mechanical trapping: Suspended solids and pathogens are trapped in the spaces between the sand grains.
- Predation: Pathogens are consumed by microorganisms in the biolayer.
- Adsorption: Pathogens are adsorbed into each other and to suspended solids in the water and sand grains.
- Natural death: Pathogens finish their life cycles or die because there is not enough food or oxygen.

=== During the run ===
The high water level (hydraulic head) in the inlet reservoir zone pushes the water through the diffuser and filter, then decreases as water flows evenly through the sand. The flow rate slows because there is less pressure to force the water through the filter. The inlet water contains dissolved oxygen, nutrients, and contaminants. It provides the oxygen required by the microorganisms in the biofilm. Large suspended particles and pathogens are trapped in the top of the sand and partially plug the pore spaces between the sand grains. This causes the flow rate to decrease.

=== Pause period (idle time) ===
Idle time typically comprises greater than 80% of the daily cycle; during this time, microbial attenuation processes are likely to be significant. Most removal occurs where water is in contact with the biofilm. The processes that occur in the biofilm have not been identified. When the standing water layer reaches the level of the outlet tube, the flow stops. Ideally, this should be high enough to keep the biofilm in the sand layer wet and allow oxygen to diffuse through the standing water to the biolayer. The pause period allows microorganisms in the biolayer to consume the pathogens and nutrients in the water. The rate of flow through the filter is restored as they are consumed. If the pause period is too long, the biolayer will consume all of the pathogens and nutrients and will die, reducing the efficiency of the filter when it is used again. The pause period should be between 1 and 48 hours. Pathogens in the non-biological zone die from a lack of nutrients and oxygen.

== Maintenance ==
Over time, particles accumulate between the filter's sand grains. As more water is poured, a biofilm forms along the top of the diffuser plate. Both of these occurrences cause a decrease in flow rate (clogging and bioclogging). Although slower flow rates generally improve water filtration due to idle time [APS1], it may become too slow for the users’ convenience. If flow rates fall below 0.1 litres/minute, it is recommended by CAWST to perform maintenance. The "swirl and dump", or wet harrowing cleaning technique, is used to restore flow rate. About 1 US gallon (3.8 L) is poured into the filter before cleaning (assuming the filter is empty). The upper layer of sand is then swirled in a circular motion. Dirty water from the swirling is dumped out and the sand is smoothed out at the top. This process is repeated until flow rate is restored. Cleaning the diffuser plate, outlet tube, lid, and outside surfaces of the filters regularly is also recommended. Long-term sustainability and efficacy of biosand filters depends on education and support from knowledgeable support personnel.

Clean Water for Haiti, a non-profit in Haiti implements an education and follow-up program post-installation of the biosand filter. The program includes visits to the beneficiary homes after one, three and twelve months and another at 5 years from installation date. During each visit, beneficiaries receive repeated instruction about safe water practices and how to take care of the filter. Based on data collected since 2010, between 94% and 99% of filters are still being used regularly 12 months after installation.

== Removal of contaminants ==
=== Turbidity ===
Results for turbidity reductions vary depending on the turbidity of the influent water. Turbid water contains sand, silt and clay. Feed turbidity in one study ranged from 1.86 to 3.9 NTU. In a study water was obtained from sample taps of water treatment plants from three local reservoirs. It poured through a slow sand filter and results showed that turbidity decreased to a mean of 1.45 NTU. In another study using surface water a 93% reduction in turbidity was observed. As the biofilm above the sand ripens, turbidity removal increases. Although biosand filters remove much turbidity, slow sand filters, which have a slower filtration rate, remove more.

=== Heavy metals ===
There is limited research on the removal of heavy metals by biosand filters. In a study conducted in South Africa, the filter removed about 64% of iron and 5% of magnesium.

=== Bacteria ===
In laboratory studies, the biosand filter has been found to remove about 98-99% of bacteria. In removal of Escherichia coli it was found that the biosand filter may increase due to biofilm formation over about two months. The removal after this time ranged from 97-99.99% depending on the daily water volume and percent primary effluent added. The addition of primary effluent or waste water facilitates growth of the biofilm which aids bacterial die-off. Research shows that biosand filters in use in the field remove fewer bacteria than ones in a controlled environment. In research conducted in 55 households of Bonao, Dominican Republic, the average E. coli reduction was about 93 percent.

=== Viruses ===
Lab tests have shown that while the filters reduce significant quantities of E. coli, they remove significantly fewer viruses because viruses are smaller. In a study using bacteriophages, virus removal ranged between 85% and 95% after 45 days of usage. A recent study has suggested that virus removal increases significantly over time, reaching 99.99% after approximately 150 days.

=== Protozoa ===
In one lab test the biosand filter removed more than 99.9% of protozoa. In tests for one type of protozoa, Giardia lamblia, the filter removed 100% over 29 days of use. It removed 99.98% of the oocysts of another protozoa, Cryptosporidium sp., possibly due to their smaller size. This removal was comparable with that of the slow sand filter.

== Health benefits ==
Studies in the Dominican Republic and Cambodia conducted by the University of North Carolina and the University of Nevada show that BSF use reduced the occurrence of diarrheal diseases by 47% in all age groups. In a study conducted by CAWST in Haiti, 95% of 187 households believed their water quality had improved since using biosand filters to clean it. 80% of users stated that their families’ health had improved since implementation. Such health perceptions on the use of biosand filters has shown to be more positive in long-term users.

== Types of biosand filters ==
=== Concrete ===
Concrete filters are the most widespread type of biosand filter. Concrete is generally preferable to other materials because of the low cost, wide availability and the ability to be constructed on-site. The plans for the concrete filter are distributed openly by CAWST. Several versions have been developed. The CAWST Version 9 biosand filter is constructed with a higher maximum loading rate. Although the filtered water passes EPA water quality standards, it is not optimal. Recent research establishes that contact time between the water and the granular material is the leading determinant in purifying water. The CAWST Version 10 biosand filter takes this into account; the volume of the water reservoir is equal to the pore space volume of the sand layer. The maximum loading rate was decreased by 33% to ensure stagnant water is in constant contact with granular material.

Concrete BioSand filters are typically manufactured using steel molds. The plans for a steel mold are openly distributed by CAWST.

Clean Water for Haiti, a non-profit organization based in Camp Marie, Haiti manufactures the biosand filters using an adaptation of the steel mold.

The non-profit organization OHorizons has designed a Wood Mold, based on CAWST’s Version 10 filter, which can function as low-cost alternative. The plans for a Wood Mold are openly available on the OHorizons website.

=== Plastic ===
Plastic filters are constructed from plastic barrels, usually formed offsite. Hydraid biosand filters are constructed from medical grade plastic with ultraviolet resistance.

=== Stainless steel ===
A stainless steel biosand filter developed by engineers at S M Sehgal Foundation, an NGO based in Gurugram (formerly Gurgaon), India, has been found to perform better than its concrete counterparts and with a wider opportunity for application and adoption in different geographical conditions. The high cost of plastic prevents its use in rural India. The stainless steel filter, called JalKalp, offers increased filtration rate and better portability (than concrete models) and better production quality control. Concrete filters are prone to breakage and can be difficult to transport due to weight (65 kg), make it unsuitable especially in remote rural or hilly locations. Common quality issues are variations in construction material and manufacturing flaws. Further, the efflorescence due to salts in water reduces the life of the concrete filter. The newly developed lightweight (4.5 kg) stainless steel biosand filter has an edge over concrete filters, overcoming each of those shortcomings and providing better quality control. Besides improving its appearance, stainless steel adds to the strength, reliability, durability, and portability of the filter.

Water quality tests demonstrate JalKalp's effectiveness against E coli, total coliforms, turbidity, and iron contamination. This filter integrates the germicidal properties of copper with the conventional filtration. Introduction of copper foil in the drainage zone of JalKalp filter has increased the removal of total coliform and E coli to 100% from contaminated water. S M Sehgal Foundation promotes the model, which requires no electricity, across India through partnerships with like-minded organizations to benefit as many rural families as possible.

There are challenges to creating biosand water filters in developing countries. Many lack the professional capability of constructing the metal forms to pour the concrete into. Finding proper mesh sizes to sift the sand layers may also be absent. In Nicaragua you may find metal workers capable of welding rebar for home construction, however, you will not find sheet metal bending equipment to create the metal molds. Sand is not sold in hardware stores like in the United States. It is most likely purchased by the pickup load from streambeds or pits and the only mesh available is 1/4 inch which is too large. When traveling to a third world country it might be best to take with you the proper mesh screens.

Another problem facing the use of the filters is adoption. Many projects may provide assistance in building the water filters and some may even distribute them but getting the host country nationals to use the filters requires much more dedication. People need to be connected to water filter owners to insist they use the devices and get them into the habit of using them. Otherwise several of the filters are abandoned and left unattended in the roads. Simply handing the filters out is insufficient for adoption.

== See also ==
- Slow sand filter
- Bank filtration
- Trickling filter
- Folkewall
- Rapid sand filter
