= Gunnerus Sustainability Award =

International award for sustainable research

Gunnerus Sustainability Science Award
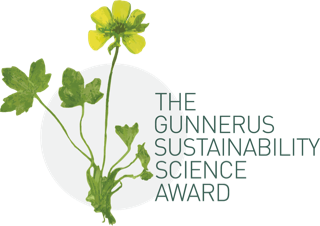
- The award's symbol, ranunculus acris, from Johan Ernst Gunnerus' herbarium (1767)
- Awarded for: An outstanding contribution to sustainable science.
- Sponsored by: the Royal Norwegian Society of Sciences and Letters (DKNVS) and the Norwegian University of Science and Technology (NTNU)
- Reward: 100,000,000 Norwegian kroner
- First award: 2012
- Final award: 2021
- Website: www.ntnu.edu/sustainability-science/award

The Gunnerus Sustainability Award is an international research award, conferred every other year by the Royal Norwegian Society of Sciences and Letters (DKNVS) and the Norwegian University of Science and Technology (NTNU). Its full name is The Gunnerus Award in Sustainability Science conferred by the Royal Norwegian Society of Sciences and Letters and the Norwegian University of Science and Technology. The prize is presented to a scholar who has made outstanding contribution to sustainable science within the fields of natural sciences, social sciences, humanities, or technological sciences, either through interdisciplinary work or through work within one of these fields.

The Gunnerus Sustainability Science Award is the first major international prize for outstanding scientific work that promotes sustainable development globally. It is named after the scientist and bishop Johan Ernst Gunnerus (1718–1773), who was one of the founders of DKNVS, and Norway's first internationally acclaimed naturalist.

The prize was established in 2012, and was then awarded to the Indian-American scientist Kamaljit S. Bawa for his pioneering research on population biology in rainforest areas.

The award was not conferred in the years 2013–2016, but in 2017 it was reestablished as a cooperation between DKNVS and NTNU. The 2017 award will be handed out at the NTNU Sustainability Science Conference in October 2017.

The laureates receive a cash award of 1,000,000 Norwegian kroner, plus a gold medal from DKNVS and a diploma.

== Laureates ==
- 2012 Kamaljit Singh Bawa
- 2017 Carl Folke
- 2019 Sandra Díaz
- 2021 Jianguo Liu

== See also ==
- List of general science and technology awards
- List of environmental awards

== Sources ==
- Presentation of the cooperation between NTNU and DKNVS on the award, from NTNU's rector to the board (2016) (Norwegian)
- Normannsen, Sølvi Waterloo (17 February 2012) «Indisk biolog får den nye Gunnerusprisen». In: Universitetsavisa (Norwegian)
- Special corresponent (17 February 2012) «Kamal Bawa gets first Gunnerus award for sustainability». In: The Hindu
