= Camille Dow Baker =

Canadian humanitarian and engineer

- Education: B. Eng. McGill University; M EvDS Masters Environmental Science Design University of Calgary.
- Awards: Canadian Medical Association Medal of Honor (2015); Honorary Doctor of Laws, University of Calgary (2007); Honorary Bachelor of Business Administration in Non-Profit Studies, Mount Royal University; Alberta Centennial Medal (2005); Woman of Vision Award from Global, Calgary (2005–6); Lewis Perinbaum Award in International Development (2008); National GRIOT Award for science and technology
- Scientific career
- Fields: Humanitarian, engineer

Camille Dow Baker is a Canadian humanitarian and engineer. She is co-founder of the not-for-profit engineering consultancy Centre for Affordable Water and Sanitation Technology (CAWST). She has held senior positions in the petroleum industry, received national and international honors and was president and CEO of CAWST until September 2011.

== Career ==
After graduating with a Bachelor of Engineering from McGill University, Baker worked in the petroleum industry for over 20 years in executive positions with Norcen Energy Resources Limited, Conwest, Alberta Energy Company and was a member of the board of directors for the Alberta Oil Sands Technical Research Authority. As a career change, seeking to apply engineering principles to the problem of supplying clean water and sanitation worldwide, she enrolled in the Masters Environmental Science Design programme at University of Calgary. She undertook her master's project on biosand filter technology with Dr. David Manz and they then co-founded CAWST in 2001 to transfer this technology to poor countries. In 2011 she stepped down from her role as CEO of CAWST but continued to work on research projects for CAWST.

CAWST is based in Calgary, Canada. It has the goal to provide education, technical training and consulting in water and sanitation to the NGOs and government agencies working with the poor in developing countries to remedy the lack of engineering expertise within the sector. Many organisations are involved in this area but Dow Baker's vision was for an organisation to provide training as long-term capacity building rather than installing infrastructure.

In 2005, as a member of the World Health Organization's Implementation Working Group of the WHO International Network to Promote Household Drinking Water and Safe Storage, Dow Baker presented CAWST's approach at a WHO International Symposium. In 2010 CAWST was awarded the Special Prize by the Fonds Suez Environnement Initiatives Institut de France, an award that recognises achievements in effective sanitation, waste and water management in developing countries. The philanthropist David P. O'Brien has supported CAWST for a decade, after learning about its work from Dow Baker. By 2014, CAWST had supported 793 implementing organizations in 68 countries, whose projects have resulted in 9.3 million people gaining access to better water or sanitation. CAWST is a member of the Global Handwashing Partnership.

== Honors ==
Baker has received several national and international awards for her humanitarian work. These include the Alberta Centennial Medal, awarded by the government of the Canadian province of Alberta to 8000 of its citizens who have made notable contributions to the province and its people, a Women of Vision Award from Global, Calgary in 2005-6 and also honorary degrees from the University of Calgary and Mount Royal University.

== Personal life ==
She was born in Trinidad and Tobago in 1957. She and her husband Derek have two children. Discussion with her then teenaged son, Hugh, was one of the reasons for her career change and foundation of CAWST after realising the great worldwide need for safe drinking water.
