= Gorgas Science Foundation =

US nonprofit organization

- Gorgas Science Foundation Inc
- Abbreviation: GSF
- Formation: 1947; 79 years ago
- Founder: Barbara T. Warburton
- Type: Nonprofit
- Tax ID no.: 74-2284635
- Legal status: 501(c)(3)
- Headquarters: Brownsville, Texas
- Website: www.sabalpalmsanctuary.org

The Gorgas Science Foundation is a nonprofit foundation based in South Texas established to support conservation and education.

The mission of Gorgas Science Foundation is to provide the highest quality educational opportunities, to foster greater awareness and understanding of ecological issues, and to encourage conservation of critical natural resources.

== History ==
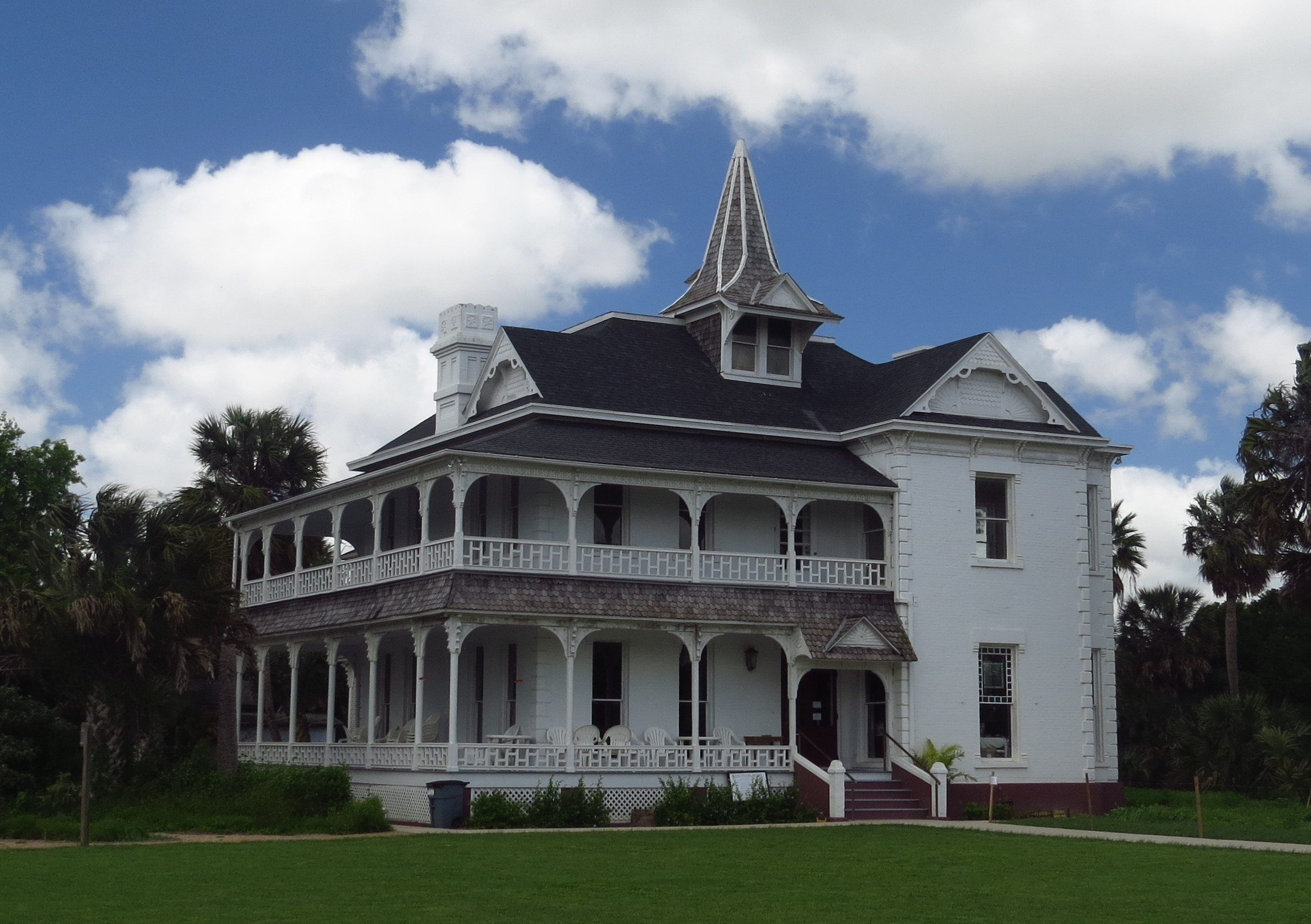
Sabal Palm Sanctuary

The foundation was started in 1947 and incorporated in 1983 by Texas Southmost College biology professor Barbara T. Warburton. The name honors pioneering research scientist Dr. William Crawford Gorgas who served at Fort Brown in the 19th century.

== Rio Grande Valley ==
In collaboration with the Audubon Society, the foundation operates the Sabal Palm Sanctuary in Brownsville, Texas. In 1994 the Gorgas Foundation produced the 18-volume "Treasures of the Rio Grande Delta" documentary that focused on the history and habitat of the region.

In 2010 the foundation published the bilingual Spanish and English El Valle: The Rio Grande Delta an exploration of the biodiversity and culture of the region.

== Hummingbirds ==
In 2016 the foundation published Hummingbirds, by John C. Arvin, the first volume of the two-volume set book on hummingbirds.

== International projects ==
=== Mexico ===
In cooperation with the University of Texas at Brownsville, the Gorgas Foundation has operated two biology field stations in the cloud forests along the eastern escarpment of northeastern Mexico's Sierra Madre Oriental. The foundation's work at Rancho del Cielo and Rancho el Cielito research stations laid the groundwork for the creation of the 360,000 acre El Cielo Biosphere Reserve in Tamaulipas.

=== India ===
The Gorgas Foundation supported years of field work in the Western Ghats of India that culminated in a 60-minute documentary by prizewinning cinematographer Sandesh Kadur titled "Sahyadris – Mountains of the Monsoon."

== See also ==
- William C. Gorgas
