= Sandesh Kadur =

Indian wildlife film producer

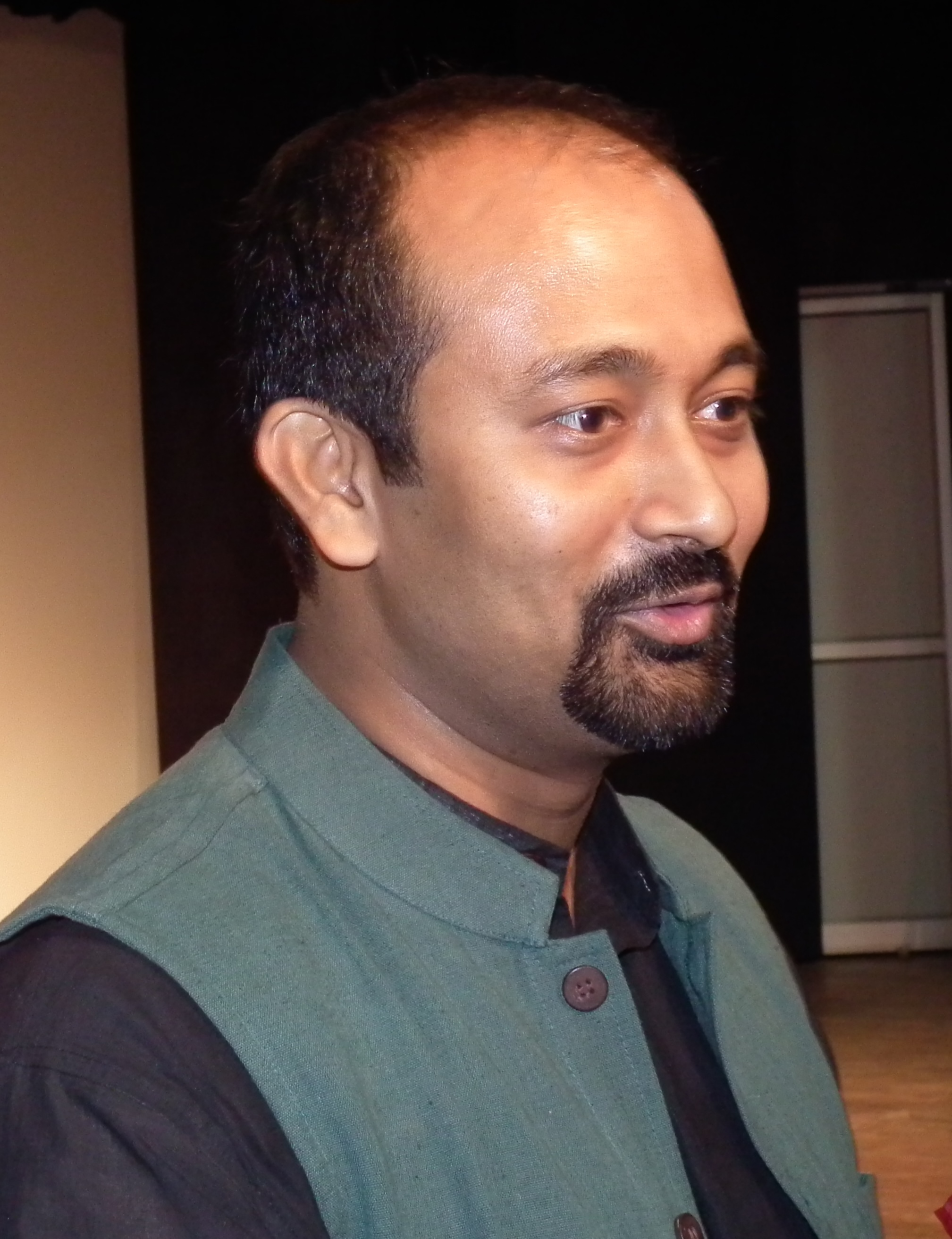
- Kadur in 2013
- Born: 19 November 1976 (age 49); Bangalore
- Years active: 2002-present
- Website: http://www.sandeshkadur.com

Sandesh Kadur is an Indian wildlife film producer and conservation photographer known for contributing to BBC Planet Earth II. In 2024, he was appointed to the National Geographic Society board of trustees, considering his contribution to explorers and groundbreaking wildlife documentary films. Sandesh's films have been shown on various television networks including National Geographic Channel, BBC, Discovery Channel and Animal Planet.

Sandesh is a Senior Fellow of The International League of Conservation Photographers (ILCP) and co-founder of Felis Creations, a visual arts company based in Bangalore, India, which works on a variety of projects ranging from natural history documentaries to art and still photography.

== Recognitions ==
- 2024 Appointed to the National Geographic Society's board of trustees

== Wildlife documentaries ==
Year	Series			Network		Title	Film Festivals	Award
2024	Nilgiris - A Shared Wilderness	Feature Documentary	Director, Cameraman		Felis Creations	Nilgiris - A Shared Wilderness		
2015	India: Natures Wonderland	TV series	Cameraman	BBC	India: Natures Wonderland	India: Natures Wonderland		
2015	Living with Big Cats	TV series	Cameraman	Animal Planet	Living with Big Cats	Living with Big Cats		
2014	Wonders of the Monsoon	TV series	Cameraman	BBC	Wonders of the Monsoon	Wonders of the Monsoon		
2011	Return of The Clouded Leopards	Feature Documentary		National Geographic	Felis Creations	Return of The Clouded Leopards		
2011	Secrets of Wild India	TV series	Cameraman	National Geographic	Icon Films	Elephant Kingdom	International Wildlife Film Festival: Montana	Best Television Series
2009	Secrets of King Cobra	Feature Documentary	Cameraman	National Geographic	Felis Creations	Secrets of King Cobra	Festival International du Film Animalier	Award for Species Conservation
2008	Natural World	TV series	Cameraman / Presenter	BBC	Icon Films	Mountains of the Monsoon	Chicago Intl’ Film Festival	Silver Plaque - Cinematography

== Books ==
Year	Title	Publisher	Awards
2013	Himalaya: Mountains of Life	ATREE	
2005	El Valle : The Rio Grande Delta	Gorgas Science Foundation	
2004	Sahyadris: India's Western Ghats	ATREE	BANFF Mountain Book Festival - Finalist

=== Publications ===
- 2013 BBC Wildlife Magazine March 2013 / Snake Charms
- 2013 BBC Knowledge August 2013 / Saving the Unicorn
- 2013 Nature's Best Photography / Indian Fol Pups
- 2013 Saevus March/April 2013 / Of Clouds and Silver Linings
- 2012 National Geographic Traveller September 2012 / Macro Photography
- 2012 BBC Wildlife Magazine August 2012 / Cloud Pleases
