= Shine (Indica album) =

Shine / Akvaario

Studio album by Indica
- Released: January 24, 2014
- Genre: Pop rock
- Length: 40:14 (Digital)
- Label: Nuclear Blast (Shine), KHY Suomen Musiikki Oy (Akvaario)
- Producer: Roland Spremberg

Indica chronology
A Way Away (2010)	Shine / Akvaario (2014)

Shine is the sixth (second English) album by the Finnish band Indica, released in 2014. It was simultaneously released in Finnish with the title Akvaario. The first single from the album, "A Definite Maybe", was released on December 6, 2013, with an accompanying lyric video on YouTube.

It ranked third on the Official Finnish Charts.

Akvaario's first single, "Älä Kanna Pelkoa", was released in late November 2013. A music video for the single was posted online December 18, 2013.

Shine and Akvaario were the last albums by the band to feature guitarist Jenny Julia, who left the band in late October 2014.

== Track listing (Shine) ==
1. "Mountain Made of Stone" - 4:10
2. "Uncovered" - 3:34
3. "A Definite Maybe" - 3:33
4. "Goodbye to Berlin" - 3:05
5. "Run Run" - 3:52
6. "Here and Now" - 3:52
7. "Missing" - 3:49
8. "Hush Now Baby" - 3:38
9. "Behind the Walls" - 3:30
10. "A Kid in the Playground" - 2:51
11. "War Child" - 3:55
12. "Humming Bird" (iTunes + digipak bonus) - 4:24
13. "Lucid" (iTunes bonus) - 4:12

== Track listing (Akvaario) ==
Akvaario cover art

1. "Älä Kanna Pelkoa" - 3:30
2. "Liian Kaunis Vailla Suuntaa" - 3:33
3. "Suunta On Vain Ylöspäin" - 3:05
4. "Savuton Ja Onneton" - 3:51
5. "Sun Oma" - 4:10
6. "Nirvanaan" - 3:35
7. "Tuuliajolla" - 4:25
8. "Kultaan Kuun" - 3:52
9. "Tuule Tuuli" - 3:39
10. "Maailma Loppuu" - 2:54
11. "Onnen Syy" - 4:13
12. "Älä Kanna Pelkoa (Akustinen)" - 4:02
13. "Akvaario (Akustinen)" - 3:24

== Singles ==
- "A Definite Maybe" (6 December 2013)
- "Älä Kanna Pelkoa" (29 November 2013)
- "Suunta On Vain Ylöspäin" (19 March 2014)

== Reception ==
Reviews for Shine have been mixed to positive. Emily Coulter of Metal Temple gave the album a 5/10, with criticisms aimed at the songs "Mountain Made of Stone" and "War Child". However, she was more positive towards other tracks, most notably "Run Run", which she said was "easily one of the best tracks from Shine". Simon McMurdo of The Sonic Reverie also had mixed feelings, feeling the album paled when compared to Indica’s previous release, A Way Away, and said the album was "a struggle to get through as a whole". He stated the album was not awful, but the songs did not "gel together". He did praise "A Definite Maybe", calling it "Eurovision pop rock at its best". Ant May of Planet Mosh was more positive, giving the album a 4/5, and saying the album was "a great album that fans of the band will love".
