= Humming Bird Records =

American record label

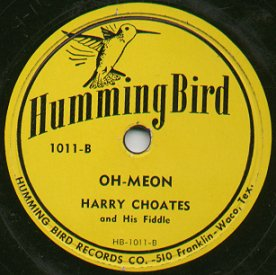
- Country of origin: United States
- Location: Waco, Texas

Humming Bird Records (often referred to as Hummingbird Records) was a mid-20th century record label based in Waco, Texas.

The label focused on local and regional artists of various genres including Cajun music (e.g. Harry Choates) and Texas Czech polka/waltz music (e.g. Frank Kubin, Rhine Winkler, etc.).

Humming Bird initially issued releases on 78rpm before transitioning to 45rpm.

== See also ==
- List of record labels
