= Kadonnut puutarha =

Studio album by Indica
- Released: 2007
- Genre: Pop rock
- Length: 40:10
- Label: SONY BMG Music Entertainment Finland

Indica chronology
Tuuliset tienoot (2005)	Kadonnut puutarha (2007)	Valoissa (2008)

Kadunnut puutarha is the third album by Finnish pop rock band Indica, released in 2007.

== Track listing ==
1. "Viimeinen jyvä" ("The Last Grain") - 2:45
2. "Linnansa vanki" ("Prisoner of the Castle") - 3:35
3. "Ikävän kantaja" ("Carrier of Longing") - 4:08
4. "Ulkona" ("Outside") - 4:05
5. "Nukkuu kedolla" ("Sleeps in the Field") - 4:25
6. "Noita" ("Witch") - 4:09
7. "Pahan tarha" ("Garden of Evil") - 4:06
8. "Äänet" ("Voices") - 3:27
9. "Mykkä" ("Mute") - 2:51
10. "Unten laiva" ("Ship of Dreams") - 3:51
11. "Helmet" ("Pearls") - 4:49

== Personnel ==
- Johanna "Jonsu" Salomaa – vocals, violin, guitars, keyboards
- Heini – bass guitar, backing vocals
- Sirkku – keyboards, clarinet, backing vocals
- Jenny – guitars, backing vocals
- Laura – drums
