= Ikuinen virta =

Studio album by Indica
- Released: August 16, 2004
- Genre: Pop rock
- Length: 51:16
- Label: Columbia/Sony BMG Music Entertainment Finland

Indica chronology
Ikuinen virta (2004)	Tuuliset tienoot (2005)

Ikuinen virta is the first album by Finnish pop rock band Indica, released in 2004. It spent a total of 29 weeks in the Finnish Top 40, peaking at number 4 in January 2005.

== Track list ==
1. Saalistaja (Predator) - 3:29
2. Scarlett - 3:29
3. Ikuinen virta (The Eternal Stream) - 4:15
4. Valehtelen (I Lie) - 4:07
5. Surusilmä (One with Sad Eyes) - 4:43
6. Lasienkeli (Glass Angel) - 2:58
7. Onnen kartano (Mansion of Joy) - 4:04
8. Ihmisen lento (The Flight of Man) - 3:31
9. Lauluja paratiisista (Songs from Paradise) - 3:10
10. Aaltojen takaa (From Behind the Waves) - 4:19
11. Vettä vasten (Against the Water) - 6:08
12. Unten maa (Land of Dreams) - 4:02 *
13. Odotan (I Wait) - 4:21 *
- Links to online bonus tracks "Odotan" and "Unten maa" *

== Video clips ==
- Scarlett
- Ikuinen virta
