= S M Sehgal Foundation =

Indian rural development charity

- Formation: 1999; 27 years ago
- Founder: Suri Sehgal (Dr. Surinder M. Sehgal), Edda Sehgal
- Type: Public charitable trust
- Purpose: Empowerment of rural communities, women and girls
- Headquarters: Gurugram, Haryana, India
- Region served: India
- Services: Rural development, water security, agriculture development, education, governance and social justice programmes
- Methods: Community development, research, capacity building and technology-based interventions
- Key people: Anjali Makhija (CEO and Trustee)
- Affiliations: International Crops Research Institute for the Semi-Arid Tropics (ICRISAT)
- Awards: Water Digest and UNESCO Best Water NGO Award; FICCI Sustainable Agriculture Award (2021); CRISIL VO Grading 1A (2023)

S M Sehgal Foundation (Sehgal Foundation) is an Indian NGO focused on rural development with its head office in Gurugram (formerly Gurgaon), Haryana. It was founded as an Indian public, charitable trust in 1999 by plant geneticist Suri Sehgal (Dr. Surinder M. Sehgal) and his wife Mrs. Edda Sehgal, who together had accumulated wealth through the 1998 sale of their hybrid seed businesses, Proagro Group.

The foundation implements rural development projects in semi-arid areas of districts in twelve states (Haryana, Rajasthan, Bihar, Telangana, Uttar Pradesh, Andhra Pradesh, Karnataka, Maharashtra, Punjab, Madhya Pradesh, Uttarakhand, and Himachal Pradesh) in water security, food security, and social justice, with an emphasis on the empowerment of women and girls. Projects are supported by multiple sources, including individual donors, corporate sponsors, government grants, academic partnerships, and foundation funding. The organization's rural research unit conducts impact assessments and original research on development themes. Other units conduct crop research and adapt rural technologies to meet local needs.

== History ==
In 1998, Suri and Edda Sehgal, American citizens, established Sehgal Family Foundation (later changed to Sehgal Foundation) in Des Moines, Iowa, as a 501(C)(3) nonprofit philanthropic organization advocating biodiversity and conservation. The Sehgals established S M Sehgal Foundation in India, in 1999, as a public charitable trust. In the first three years, it made grants to other not-for-profit organizations. In 2002, S M Sehgal Foundation began grassroots development implementation with communities in Mewat District, now called Nuh, Haryana, and continued to expand its role. As programs evolved, the founders stressed that "Many approaches are needed in order to create an impact." The foundation has been recognized in the past as "IRRAD (Institute for Rural Research and Development) an initiative of S M Sehgal Foundation." Some awards for their development work are presented in that name. S M Sehgal Foundation has a consultive status with the Economic and Social Council of the United Nations.

== Programs ==
S M Sehgal Foundation's programs are interrelated with a focus on gender equity. The organization's tagline, "Together we empower rural India," refers to empowering individuals and members of village-level institutions to participate in projects undertaken on their behalf in order to further their own development.

=== Water Management ===
Foundation staff and volunteers work alongside villagers to obtain and secure adequate local water supplies, improve sanitation, and manage wastewater in their communities. Information and awareness outreach includes door-to-door campaigns and water literacy training. Infrastructure projects include rooftop rainwater harvesting, check dams, water storage tanks, recharge wells and ponds, biosand filters, and wastewater disposal structures. The foundation supports rejuvenating traditional wells as a more sustainable alternative to tube wells. These interventions help dry villages become water sufficient. In 2014, the foundation won the Millennium Alliance Award for Outstanding Work on Pressurized Recharge Wells for Creating Fresh Water Pockets in Saline Ground Water Areas. The technology was recognized in September 2015 at the United Nations Solutions Summit as one of 14 "innovative" projects profiled that provide "breakthrough solutions" to help meet sustainable global development goals. S M Sehgal Foundation engineers designed a biosand filter that was more effective than previous versions in treating water contamination at the household level. The filter operates without electricity and is effective against E.coli, total coliforms, turbidity, and iron contamination. The technology integrates germicidal properties of copper with conventional filtration. Sehgal Foundation technical experts collaborate with other NGOs, government bodies, and educational institutions to prepare for monsoon harvesting.

=== Agriculture Development ===
The agricultural development program promotes sustainable farming practices to improve soil health and crop yield, use water efficiently, empower women farmers, and enhance farmers' income. The foundation sponsors demonstration plots and training on a crop-specific package of practices. Exposure tours, farmers’ meetings, and field days showcase methods of composting, vermicomposting, drip irrigation, sprinkler irrigation, the effective use of microorganisms for quality manure. Information communication technology (ICT) provides voice messages to farmers on crop and livestock management. Partnership projects of differing lengths with farmer groups vary by crop, strategy, location, and beneficiary. Native plants are planted in catchment areas and around check dams, ponds, and school boundaries.

The foundation's crop improvement research unit housed in Hyderabad at International Crops Research Institute for the Semi-Arid Tropics (ICRISAT) is recognized as a Scientific and Industrial Research Organization by the Department of Scientific and Industrial Research, Ministry of Science and Technology, Government of India. The scientists and researchers work to identify elite germplasm assists scientists in public and private sectors in developing new and improved varieties and hybrids.

=== Local Participation and Sustainability ===
A good rural governance program promoting local participation and sustainability of projects trains citizens and community leaders about their rights, how to access public services, how to participate with government representatives in addressing and solving local community problems, and how to activate and strengthen community panchayats (village councils), education committees, and health, sanitation, and nutrition committees. Legal literacy camps train citizens to use systems to obtain their rightful entitlements. In 2014, the foundation created a telephone hotline for citizens to receive guidance on addressing concerns to government departments and village-level institutions. The Sushasan Abhi team works with and educates communities and panchayats to promote sanitation and eliminate open defecation in keeping with the Swachh Bharat Mission (clean India campaign). Awareness is raised about government schemes and entitlements so that villagers are empowered to claim their rights.

=== Transform Lives one school at a time ===
The Transform Lives program initiated by S M Sehgal Foundation offers to create a conducive environment for schoolchildren studying in government schools, by providing them various amenities, such as access to clean drinking water, improved sanitation facilities, a school environment that is conducive to learning, and training in digital and life skills awareness. The program also encourages parents, teachers, and children to increase enrollment and decrease dropout rates in rural government schools, with a particular focus on girls. Additionally, School Management Committees (SMCs) are given assistance and training to enhance their abilities and ensure the school functions effectively and continuously.

=== Outreach for Development ===
Outreach for Development initiatives facilitates civil participation and measurable social progress in rural communities by creating awareness and sharing knowledge. The program employs a rural community media mix including a rural community radio station (Alfaz-e-Mewat), social media, and other print, visual and interactive formats to strengthen and promote the attainment of rural development goals. Information is shared to stimulate dialogue and engagement to influence behaviour changes. By providing a platform for grassroots communities to voice their views, people are encouraged to identify issues affecting their lives and to work together to resolve them. Last-mile outreach activities mitigate the large information divide for acceleration of social change by bringing local voices and their concerns to the forefront.

=== Rural Research and Development ===
Rural Research and Development maximizes the impact of poverty alleviation initiatives for rural communities through using participatory research and impact evaluation as practical tools informing action, outcomes and learning. This focuses on integrating all components of the research process which are undertaken to design, implement and sustain the interventions by Sehgal Foundation in the rural areas of the country. These components largely include needs assessment, baseline surveys, mid-term assessment, and sustainable impact evaluation (SIA).

== Community Radio ==
In 2012, the foundation launched a community radio station in Ghaghas village in Mewat, Haryana. Alfaz-e-Mewat (Voice of Mewat) FM 107.8 provides call-in programs for discussion of village issues and government programs. Educational and entertainment programs and children's programs are developed and shared in collaboration with other community radio stations. Community members are broadcasters and reporters. Informational programs address farm practices, sanitation and health issues, conservation and environmental awareness, rural governance, and the empowerment of women and girls. In areas without radio signals, villagers listen and participate by calling a toll-free number. Alfaz-e-Mewat creates programs that address emerging concerns for young people as well as adult villagers, including mental health issues, stress in school, girls being harassed, and information about safety as brought about by the COVID-19 pandemic.

== Sustainable "green" building ==
The main headquarters building in Gurugram, Haryana, was built in accordance with a platinum (the highest) rating of Leadership in Energy and Environmental Design (LEED) standards set by the U.S. Green Building Council. The building, by architect Ashok "Bihari" Lall, contains a solar power generation unit, a rooftop rainwater harvesting system, a 35 KW solar photovoltaic installation on the rooftop that meets 100% of the building's electricity needs, and an indoor climate control mechanism. This was the first institutional building in Gurgaon to use materials specifically for the purpose of minimizing its ecological footprint. The foundation initiated the use of solar lighting as an alternative power source in rural villages to address power blackouts and provide business opportunities to villagers.

== Grants, endowments, and collaborations ==
Sehgal Foundation in the US and S M Sehgal Foundation in India fund organizations and initiatives that promote biodiversity, conservation, and crop improvement.

- Funding was provided to create the William L. Brown Center for Economic Botany at the Missouri Botanical Garden in St. Louis.
- An endowment to the Missouri Botanical Garden established the William L. Brown Award for Excellence in Plant Genetic Resources Conservation.
- Ongoing collaboration with ICRISAT in Hyderabad, India, began in 2001 with a research grant for development of elite sorghum and millet germplasm.
- Seed money was provided for establishing Dharma Vana Arboretum in Andhra Pradesh to assist preservation of endangered species of plants and trees.
- A grant was given to ATREE (Ashoka Trust for Research in Ecology and the Environment) to help protect biodiversity in the Western Ghats and Eastern Himalayas.

== Awards & Recognitions ==
- Starting in 2008, the Water Digest and UNESCO Best Water NGO Award went to Sehgal Foundation for several years in a row.
- In 2011, the American India Foundation (AIF) gave Suri Sehgal a Leadership in Philanthropy Award.
- In 2013, the foundation's IRRAD project, "Strengthening the Demand and Supply for Better Village Governance" was short-listed for the Rockefeller Foundation's Top 100 Next Century Innovators Awards.
- Founder Suri Sehgal was presented with the 2013 Global Indian Karmaveer Puraskaar Lifetime Achievement Award for Social Justice and Citizen Action.
- Jane Schukoske, CEO, received the 2014 Amity Women's Achievers Award.
- In 2015, the foundation's radio station, Alfaz-e-Mewat, won the Manthan award for community broadcasting.
- In 2016, Sehgal Foundation won the 9th Global Agriculture Leadership Award from the Indian Council of Food and Agriculture (ICFA) in the Livelihood Leadership category.
- The Ministry of Water Resources, Government of India, recognized the foundation in 2016 for "innovative practices of groundwater augmentation through rainwater harvesting and artificial recharge."
- In March 2017 Sehgal Foundation was presented with the Iowa Secretary of Agriculture Leader Award for progress, innovative solutions, and commitment to serving communities through collaboration and hard work.
- In November 2018, Jay Sehgal received the University of Iowa's International Impact Award for "sustained and deep contributions" to "promote global understanding in his work with Sehgal Foundation in the US and n of "sustained and deep contributions" to "promote global understanding in his work with Sehgal Foundation in the US and India."
- In November 2021, S M Sehgal Foundation received the FICCI Sustainable Agriculture Award (second place) in the Climate Resistant Agriculture Development category.
- In December 2021, S M Sehgal Foundation won the Sabera Award for Special Jury Commendation for Best NGO of the Year. "Sabera's annual social impact award and summit highlight the best practices & sustainable development initiatives by corporates, nonprofits, and individuals." The award recognized that, in addition to being active in 11 states across India with rural development initiatives, S M Sehgal Foundation's work in the past year had supported communities during the COVID-19 pandemic with essential items including oxygen concentrators; PPE kits, gloves, sanitizer, surgical masks, and N95 masks for frontline medical and nursing staff, "which affected the lives of millions of people in India."
- In 2022, The organization won the Bhamashah Award from the Department of Education, Rajasthan, for work in rural government schools under the Transform Lives program.
- Honored with ABSA Award for Agriculture Development in Agri-Business Summit and Agri Awards in 2022.
- Suri Sehgal was announced the winner of the MS Swaminathan Award for the year 2022 for leadership in agriculture.
- In July 2023, Community radio station Alfaz-e-Mewat FM 107.8, an initiative (S M Sehgal Foundation), was awarded the national award for its sustainability model by the Ministry of Information and Broadcasting, Government of India.
- CRISIL is Credit Rating Information Services of India Limited, an Indian consulting firm offering ratings, analysis, risk and policy advice, and is a branch of S&P Global-an American corporation. CRISIL has recently entered the space of independent grading of NGOs. It provides a comprehensive assessment of a not-for profit, with detailed insights on its governance structure, management capabilities, internal controls and risk management mechanisms, program implementation capabilities, funding profile and cost structure.
  In September 2023, S M Sehgal Foundation was awarded with CRISIL VO grading 1A, signifying ” Very Strong Delivery Capability and Financial Proficiency.
- Krishi Jyoti, a joint initiative of S M Sehgal Foundation and The Mosaic Company, received the India CSR & Sustainability Award 2023 in the Best Corporate Social Responsibility (CSR) Initiative category.
- Ms. Anjali Makhija, CEO and Trustee of S M Sehgal Foundation, received the BW Social Impact Awards 2023.
- Transform Lives one school at a time, a school transformation program of S M Sehgal Foundation, received the Bhamashah Award in the category of Shiksha Vibhushan by the Directorate of Education, Government of Rajasthan, in September 2023.
- S M Sehgal Foundation's community Radio Connect FM 107.8, is now available worldwide on Radio Garden app.
- The head of the Department of Regional Water Studies at Teri School of Advanced Studies says, "Matikalp Ceramic Pot Filter provided by S M Sehgal Foundation for testing has demonstrated excellent efficacy in removing iron, manganese, and fecal coliform from drinking water, effectively reducing their concentration to safe limits."
