= Pokhara International Mountain Film Festival =

Pokhara International Mountain Film Festival is a three-day-plus film festival held in the city of Pokhara in Nepal. This non-competitive film festival showcases documentaries, and feature films that deals with environment and culture of the Himalayas.

The festival, organized by Pokhara Film Society, happens usually towards the end of December every year. Besides Pokhara, the films are also shown in other cities of Nepal like Manang, Mustang, Ghale Gaun and Ghandruk.

== 2014 ==
The festival was held on December 10 to 12, at The Mountain Museum, Gharipatan, Pokhara, and was jointly organized by The Pokhara Film Society and The Federation of Film Societies of Nepal. 25 and documentaries from 11 different countries were screened during the three-day event.

== 2015 ==
The festival was not conducted in 2015 due to the April 2015 Nepal earthquake and the six-month-long inhumane blockade.

== 2016 ==
The 2016 IMFF was organized from 21 to 23 December, and a total of 52 films and documentaries from 22 countries were screened.

A Song for Barpak Nepal	Naya Jhul Nepal	Laaz Nepal
Dhartiputra Nepal	Mela Nepal	Dadyaa: The Woodpeckers of Rotha Nepal
Mirror Nepal	Mirror Nepal	Mirror Nepal
Forging Bonds United States	Forging Bonds Italy	Forging Bonds UK
