= Mireya Correa =

Panamanian botanist (1940–2022)

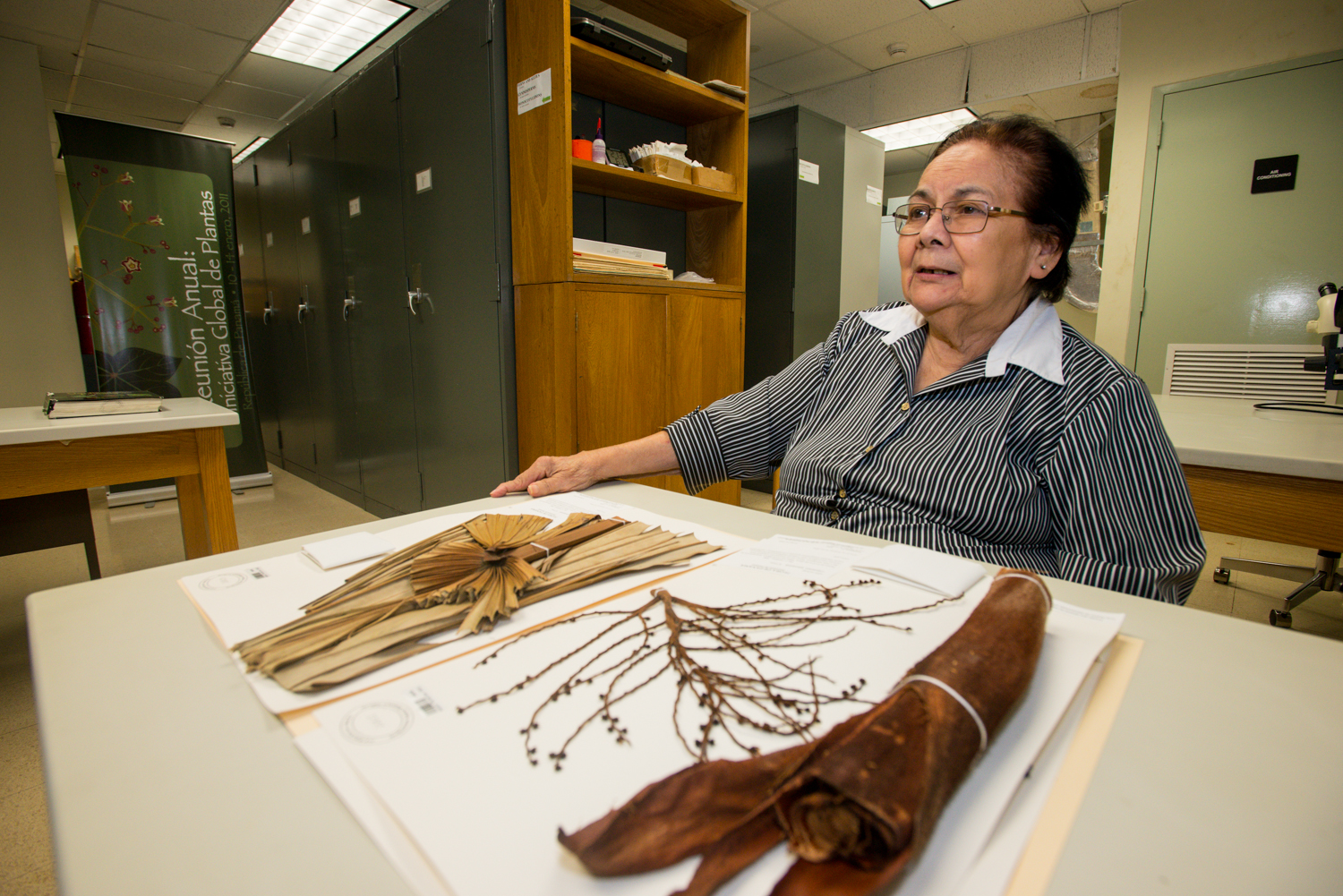
- Born: February 6, 1940; Panama
- Died: November 22, 2022 (aged 82); Panama
- Education: University of Panama, Duke University
- Scientific career
- Fields: Botany
- Workplaces: Director of the Herbarium at the University of Panama

Mireya Dorotea Correa Arroyo (February 6, 1940 – November 22, 2022) was a Panamanian botanist and plant taxonomist known for her work with the flora of Panama.

== Career ==
Correa graduated from the University of Panama with a degree in biology and chemistry in 1963. She received a master's degree in botany from Duke University in Durham, North Carolina in 1967. Her area of expertise was the systematic study of vascular plants with emphasis of the flora of Panama. She was a professor at the University of Panama and pioneered formal botanical studies in Panama. She became a scientific collaborator at the Smithsonian Tropical Research Institute in 1987.

She was the Director of the Herbarium at the University of Panama, a research and teaching facility of the Natural Science Faculty from the time of its founding in 1968. The collection contains more than seventy thousand specimens. It has been part of the Network of Mesoamerican and Caribbean Herbaria since 1995. She created an online database that digitized 12,000 of the specimens and records of the herbarium.

== Works ==
The standard author abbreviation M.D.Correa is used to indicate this person as the author when citing a botanical name.

== Literature ==
- Correa, M.D.; dos Santos Silva, Tânia Regina (2005). Drosera (Droseraceae). Bronx, NY: New York Botanical Garden Press. ISBN 9780893274634. OCLC 255326402.
- Correa, M.D. (1998). Arboles y arbustos. Vol. 2. Chicago: Field Museum of Natural History. OCLC 183079367.
- Correa, M.D. (1998). Arboles y Arbustos. Vol. 1. Chicago: Field Museum of Natural History. OCLC 183079354.
- Correa, M.D.; Galdames, C. (1998). Guía preliminar de campo flora del Parque Nacional Altos de Campana, Panamá. Chicago: Environmental & Conservation Programs, The Field Museum of Natural History, The Andrew Mellon Foundation. OCLC 44114654.
- D'Arcy, W.G.; Correa, M.D., eds. (1985). The Botany and Natural History of Panama: La Botánica e Historia Natural de Panamá. Vol. v. 10 1985. Saint Louis, Missouri: Missouri Botanical Garden. ISBN 978-0-915279-03-6.
- Correa, M.D. (1974). Lista de plantas existentes en el Herbario de la Universidad de Panamá. Departamento de Botánica, Facultad de Ciencias Naturales y Farmacia, Universidad de Panamá. OCLC 24084114.

== Awards ==
- 2008 - Medal José Cuatrecasas for Excellence in Tropical Botany.
- 2008 - Emeritus Scientist of the Year offered by the Asociacion para el avance de la Ciencia (APANAC).
