= Hummingbird cake =

Banana-pineapple spice cake

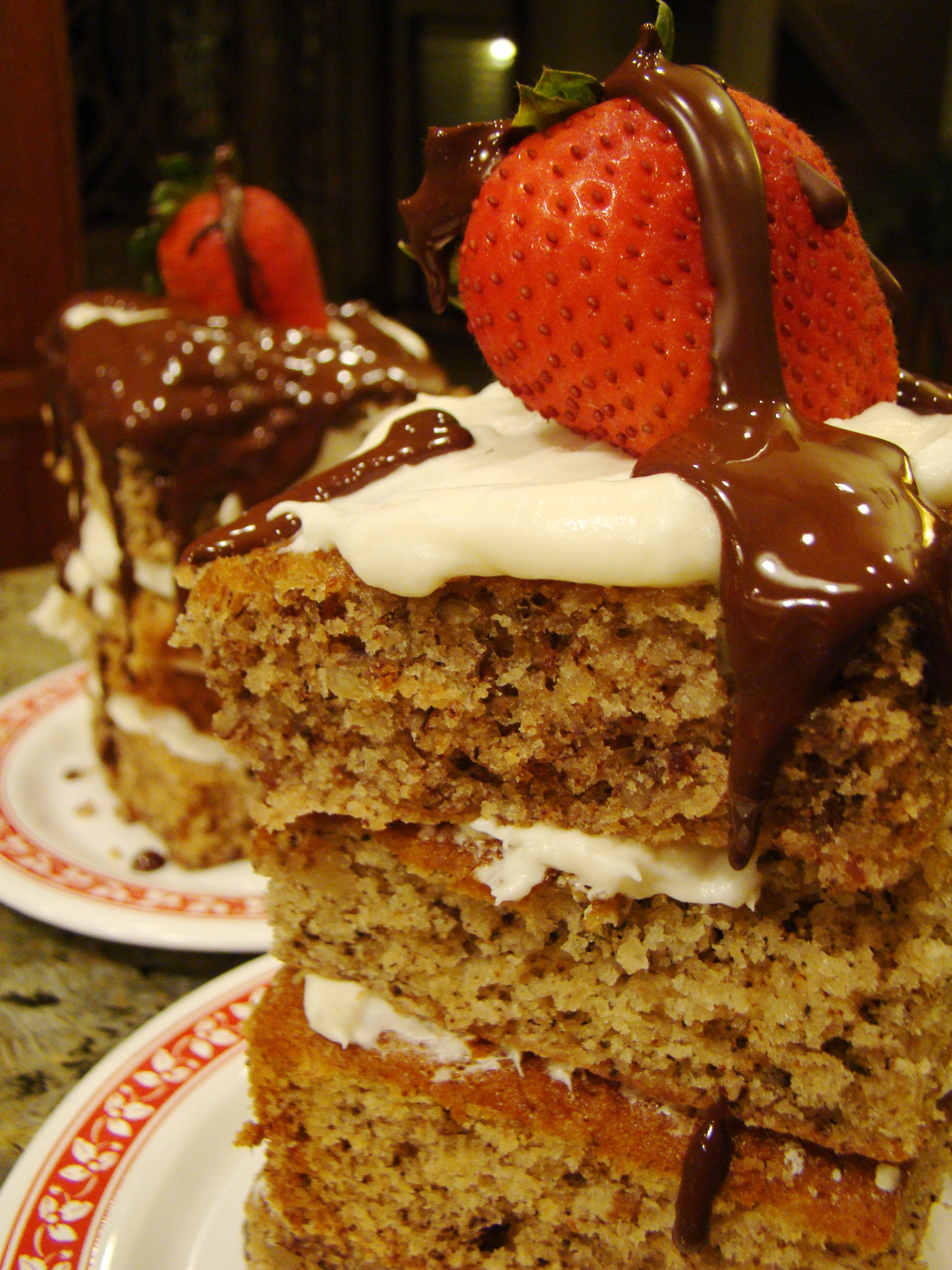
- Alternative names: doctor bird cake
- Type: Cake
- Place of origin: Jamaica
- Main ingredients: Flour, sugar, vegetable oil, Bananas, pineapples, pecans, vanilla, eggs, spices

Hummingbird cake is a banana-pineapple spice cake originating in Jamaica and a popular dessert in the southern United States since the 1970s. Ingredients include flour, sugar, salt, vegetable oil, ripe banana, pineapple, cinnamon, pecans, vanilla extract, eggs, and leavening agent. It is often served with cream cheese frosting.

== History ==
Created in Jamaica where the dessert is called the doctor bird cake (or Dr. Bird cake), it is named after the island's national bird, the scissors-tail hummingbird (locally known as the doctor bird). In 1968, the Jamaica Tourist Board exported the recipe for hummingbird cake, along with other local Jamaican recipes, in media press kits sent to the United States. The marketing was aimed at American consumers to create interest in visiting the island.

One of the first known publications of the recipe in US print, as written by L.H. Wiggins, was in the February 1978 issue of Southern Living. The recipe was a hit with readers and won the Favorite Cake Award later that same year at the Kentucky State Fair.

It was later voted Southern Living's favorite recipe in 1990 and was noted as the most requested recipe in the magazine's history. The Southern cake typically has two or three layers with pecans (or walnuts), mashed ripe bananas, canned crushed pineapple and a sweet cream cheese frosting.
