= Tuuliset tienoot =

Studio album by Indica
- Released: 2005
- Genre: Pop rock
- Length: 39:09
- Label: SONY BMG Music Entertainment Finland

Indica chronology
| Ikuinen virta (2004) | Tuuliset tienoot (2005) | Kadonnut puutarha (2007) |

Tuuliset tienoot is the second album by Finnish pop rock band Indica, released in 2005. It spent a total of 27 weeks in the Finnish Top 40, peaking at number 12 in February 2006.

== Track listing ==
1. Vuorien taa (Behind the Mountains) - 3:16
2. Pidä kädestä (Hold my Hand) - 3:49
3. Tuuliset tienoot (Windy Shires) - 3:59
4. Lapsuuden metsä (Childhood Forest) - 5:07
5. Häkkilintu (Bird Cage) - 3:21
6. Varo (Watch Out) - 4:17
7. Niin tuleni teen (That's How I Make My Fire) - 3:48
8. Kummajaisten joukko (A Number of Freaks) - 4:11
9. Rannalla (On The Beach) - 5:21
10. Viimeinen tanssi (The Last Dance) - 3:20
