= Wonders of the Monsoon =

- Also known as: Lands of the Monsoon
- Genre: Nature documentary
- Narrated by: Colin Salmon
- Composer: Nitin Sawhney
- Country of origin: United Kingdom
- No. of episodes: 5

Production
- Executive producers: Kathryn Jeffs; Paul Bradshaw; Chris Cole; James Honeybourne
- Running time: 60 minutes
- Production companies: BBC Natural History Unit; Discovery Channel

Original release
- Network: BBC Two; BBC Two HD
- Release: 5 October – 2 November 2014

Wonders of the Monsoon (also known as Lands of the Monsoon) is a BBC documentary series which ran for five episodes between 5 October 2014 and 2 November 2014, and aired on BBC Two. The series focus for a variety of locations around the world features including India, Australia and islands of the Pacific Ocean which are all the focus of the monsoon rains.

The series was composed by Nitin Sawhney and narrated by Colin Salmon.

== Episodes ==
All original and international episode names were given from BBC website. All broadcast dates refer to the original UK transmission.

No.	Original Title / International Title	Original release date
1	"Waiting for the Rains" "Bringer and Destroyer"	5 October 2014
Starting in the monsoon region of Northern Australia before moving onto Christmas Island where the rains trigger a migration of red crabs. In India, the Delhi stock exchange sees the price of rice rise every day the rains fail to appear.
2	"Deluge"	12 October 2014
Pre-monsoon showers arrive in Thailand as Assamese macaque play in the water and eat water snails. Four months of rain begin in India where male Indian common toads turn yellow-gold for one day in a chance to mate. The Mekong in Cambodia swells, forcing water back up its tributary to fill the Tonlé Sap Lake.
3	"The Drought" "Drought"	19 October 2014
The winds reverse as the monsoon doesn't bring rain but brings in dry air and drought in places. In Borneo, a bearded pig has worked out a strategy for surviving. Camels in the Rajasthan Desert provide vital transport while elephants gather in Sri Lanka for the appearance of fresh grass.
4	"Strange Castaways" "Isles of Plenty"	26 October 2014
The Black-crested macaque thrive in large troops on the Indonesian island of Sulawesi where they eat fruit. Soil erosion is a problem in rainswept Borneo, so plants have to compete for scarce nutrients and take to evolving some ingenious techniques to survive.
5	"People of the Monsoon" "Transformation"	2 November 2014
People of Palawan still hunt in forest and live in caves, and their existence relies on a respect for nature. The Bishnoi have also been known to lay their lives down for nature. With a minimal farmland that supports a high density of people, the group are under pressure.

== Merchandise ==
A two-disc DVD and two-disc Blu-ray set for the series were released on 17 November 2014.

In Australia and New Zealand, DVD was released by ABC DVD/Village Roadshow on 21 October 2015.
