= Jianguo Liu =

Sustainability scientist

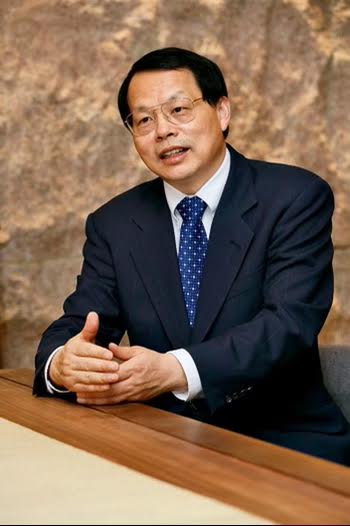
- Born: Jianguo Liu; 1963 (age 62–63); Hunan, China
- Other name: Jack Liu
- Scientific career
- Fields: Sustainability Scientist, Human-Environment Scientist, Conservationist, Ecologist
- Institutions: Michigan State University

Jianguo Liu (Chinese: 刘建国; born 1963) is a Chinese American ecologist and sustainability scientist specializing in the human-environment and sustainability studies. He is University Distinguished Professor at Michigan State University.

== Early life and education ==
Liu was born in Hunan Province, Southern China, in 1963. He received a B.S. in plant protection at Hunan Agricultural University in 1983, an M.S. in ecology at the Chinese Academy of Sciences in Beijing in 1986, and a PhD in ecology (with focus on ecological economics) from the University of Georgia in 1992. He did his postdoctoral study at Harvard University during 1992-1994.

== Career ==
Liu joined the faculty of Michigan State University in 1995. He has been the Rachel Carson Chair in Sustainability since 2004 and University Distinguished Professor since 2005. In 2004, he became the founding director of the Center for Systems Integration and Sustainability.

Liu was a visiting scholar (on sabbatical) at Stanford University (2001-2002), Harvard University (2008), and Princeton University (2009). He has also been a research affiliate with the Institute of Social Research at the University of Michigan – Ann Arbor since 2002.

== Research ==
Liu has published approximately 400 journal articles, book chapters, and books, in collaboration with hundreds of students and scholars around the world. His publications cover a variety of topics, such as telecoupling, systems integration, sustainability, protected areas, biodiversity, ecosystem restoration, ecosystem services, forest dynamics, drivers of environmental change (e.g. divorce and household proliferation), coupled human and natural systems, ecology, ecological economics, conservation, environment, food systems, land use and land cover change, landscapes, metacoupling, climate change impact, nature-based climate solutions (e.g., natural carbon capture and sequestration), natural resources (e.g., bioenergy, forests, land, water), sociology (e.g., social norms), sustainable development goals, systems modeling, technology (e.g., AI, geographic information systems, machine learning, remote sensing), and wildlife. Below are a few highlights.

== Selected publications ==
- Liu, Jianguo (2023). "Leveraging the metacoupling framework for sustainability science and global sustainable development". National Science Review 10(7), nwad090.
- Liu, Jianguo, Thomas Dietz, Stephen R. Carpenter, William W. Taylor, Marina Alberti, Peter Deadman, Charles Redman, Alice Pell, Carl Folke, Zhiyun Ouyang, and Jane Lubchenco (2021). "Coupled Human and Natural Systems: The evolution and applications of an integrated framework". Ambio' 50:1778-1783.
- Xu, Zhenci, Sophia N. Chau, Xiuzhi Chen, Jian Zhang, Yingjie Li, Thomas Dietz, Jinyan Wang, Julie A. Winkler, Fan Fan, Baorong Huang, Shuxin Li, Shaohua Wu, Anna Herzberger, Ying Tang, Dequ Hong, Yunkai Li and Jianguo Liu (2020)." Assessing progress towards sustainable development over space and time". Nature. 577 (7788): 74-78.
- Liu, Jianguo (2020) Telecoupling. In: The International Encyclopedia of Geography: People, the Earth, Environment, and Technology. Edited by Douglas Richardson, Noel Castree, Michael F. Goodchild, Audrey Kobayashi, Weidong Liu, and Richard A. Marston. John Wiley & Sons, Ltd.
- Liu, Jianguo, Vanessa Hull, H. Charles J. Godfray, David Tilman, Peter Gleick, Holger Hoff, Claudia Pahl-Wostl, Zhenci Xu, Min Gon Chung, Jing Sun and Shuxin Li (2018). "Nexus approaches to global sustainable development". Nature Sustainability 1(9):466–476.
- Liu, Jianguo (2017). "Integration across a metacoupled world". Ecology and Society 22(4):29.
- Liu, Jianguo; Mooney, Harold; Hull, Vanessa; Davis, Steven J.; Gaskell, Joanne; Hertel, Thomas; Lubchenco, Jane; Seto, Karen C.; Gleick, Peter; Kremen, Claire; Li, Shuxin (2015). "Systems integration for global sustainability". Science 347 (6225):1258832.
- Liu, Jianguo, Vanessa Hull, Mateus Batistella, Ruth DeFries, Thomas Dietz, Feng Fu, Thomas W. Hertel, R. Cesar Izaurralde, Eric F. Lambin, Shuxin Li, Luiz A. Martinelli, William J. McConnell, Emilio F. Moran, Rosamond Naylor, Zhiyun Ouyang, Karen R. Polens (2013). "Framing sustainability in a telecoupled world". Ecology and Society 18(2):26.
- Yu, Eunice and Jianguo Liu (2007). "Environmental Impacts of Divorce". PNAS 104(51):20629–20634.
- Liu, Jianguo, Thomas Dietz, Stephen R. Carpenter, Marina Alberti, Carl Folke, Emilio Moran, Alice N. Pell, Peter Deadman, Timothy Kratz, Jane Lubchenco, Elinor Ostrom, Zhiyun Ouyang, William Provencher, Charles L. Redman, Stephen H. Schneider, William W. Taylor (2007). "Complexity of Coupled Human and Natural Systems". Science 317(5844):1513-1516.
- Liu, Jianguo & Jared Diamond (2005). "China's environment in a globalizing world". Nature 435:1179-86.
- Liu, Jianguo, Gretchen C. Daily, Paul R. Ehrlich and Gary W. Luck (2003). "Effects of household dynamics on resource consumption and biodiversity". Nature 421:(530–533).
- Liu, Jianguo; Marc Linderman; Zhiyun Ouyang; Li An; Jian Yang; Hemin Zhang (2001). "Ecological degradation in protected areas: The Case of Wolong Nature Reserve for Giant Pandas" Science 292(5514):98-101.

== Honors and awards ==
- Member of the USA’s National Academy of Sciences, 2025
- Top Cited Scholar according to Scilit
- Highly Ranked Scholar according to ScholarGPS
- Highly Cited Researcher according to Clarivate Analytics
- Member, Royal Norwegian Society of Sciences and Letters, 2022
- Eminent Ecologist Award, 2022
- Gunnerus Award in Sustainability Science, 2021
- World Sustainability Award (with John Elkington), 2021
- Special Tribute, State of Michigan, 2021
- Innovations in Sustainability Science Award, 2020
- Fellow, American Academy of Arts and Sciences, 2018
- Distinguished Landscape Ecologist Award, 2018
- Fellow, Ecological Society of America, 2018
- “Highly Cited Researcher”, Clarivate Analytics, 2018
- Sustainability Science Award, 2017
- Member, American Philosophical Society, 2015
- Fellow, American Association for the Advancement of Science, 2010
- Ralph H. Smuckler Award for Advancing International Studies and Programs, 2007
- Guggenheim Fellowship, 2006
- Distinguished Service Award, 2006
- Distinguished Faculty Award, 2005
- Teacher-Scholar Award, 2002
- Aldo Leopold Leadership Fellow, 2001
- National Science Foundation CAREER Award, 1997
