= Ashoka Trust for Research in Ecology and the Environment =

Research institution in Bangalore, India

Coordinates: 13°03′51.17″N 77°37′04.88″E

Ashoka Trust for Research in Ecology and the Environment (ATREE) is a research institution founded by Kamaljit S. Bawa based in Bangalore, India focusing in the areas of biodiversity conservation and sustainable development.

The trust works to generate rigorous interdisciplinary knowledge for achieving environmental conservation and sustainable development in a socially just manner, to enable the use of this knowledge by policy makers and society, and to train the next generation of scholars and leaders.

The trust work in a large geographical area, including Western Ghats and the Himalayas.
