= Land surface effects on climate =

Mean annual temperature change on land by region

Land surface effects on climate are wide-ranging and vary by region. Deforestation and exploitation of natural landscapes play a significant role. Some of these environmental changes are similar to those caused by the effects of global warming.

== Deforestation effects ==
Major land surface changes affecting climate include deforestation (especially in tropical areas), and destruction of grasslands and xeric woodlands by overgrazing, or lack of grazing. These changes in the natural landscape reduce evapotranspiration, and thus water vapor, in the atmosphere, limiting clouds and precipitation. It has been proposed, in the journal Atmospheric Chemistry and Physics, that evaporation rates from forested areas may exceed that of the oceans, creating zones of low pressure, which enhance the development of storms and rainfall through atmospheric moisture recycling. The American Institute of Biological Sciences published a similar paper in support of this concept in 2009. In addition, with deforestation and/or destruction of grasslands, the amount of dew harvested (or condensed) by plants is greatly diminished. All of this contributes to desertification in these regions.

25-50% of the rainfall in the Amazon basin comes from the forest, and if deforestation reaches 30-40% most of the Amazon basin will enter a permanent dry climate. In another article published by Nature, it points out that tropical deforestation can lead to large reductions in observed precipitation.

This concept of land-atmosphere feedback is common among permaculturists, such as Masanobu Fukuoka, who, in his book, The One Straw Revolution, said "rain comes from the ground, not the sky."

Deforestation, and conversion of grasslands to desert, may also lead to cooling of the regional climate. This is because of the albedo effect (sunlight reflected by bare ground) during the day, and rapid radiation of heat into space at night, due to the lack of vegetation and atmospheric moisture.

== Mountain meteorological effects ==
=== Orographic lift ===
Orographic lift occurs when an air mass is forced from a low elevation to a higher elevation as it moves over rising terrain. As the air mass gains altitude it quickly cools down adiabatically, which can raise the relative humidity to 100% and create clouds and, under the right conditions, precipitation.

=== Rain shadow ===
A rain shadow is a dry area on the leeward side of a mountainous area (away from the wind). The mountains block the passage of rain-producing weather systems and cast a "shadow" of dryness behind them. Wind and moist air are drawn by the prevailing winds towards the top of the mountains, condensing and precipitating before it crosses the top. In an effect opposite that of orographic lift, the air, without much moisture left, advances behind the mountains, creating a drier side called the "rain shadow".

=== Foehn wind ===
A föhn or foehn is a type of dry, warm, down-slope wind that occurs in the lee (downwind side) of a mountain range.

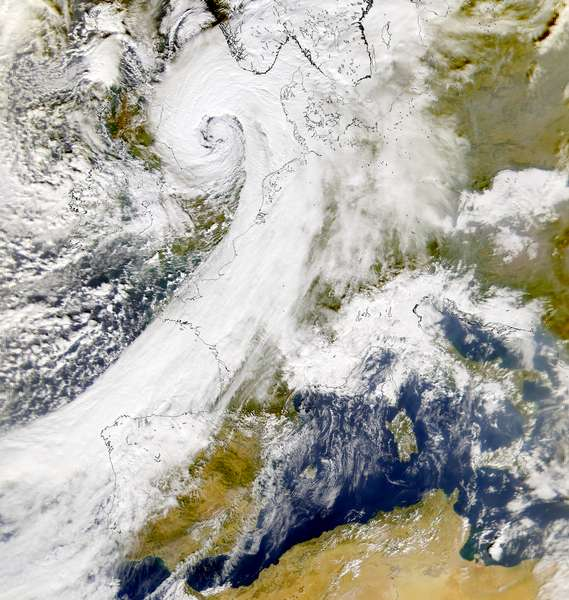
Föhn can be initiated when deep low pressures move into Europe drawing moist Mediterranean air over the Alps.

It is a rain shadow wind that results from the subsequent adiabatic warming of air that has dropped most of its moisture on windward slopes (see orographic lift). As a consequence of the different adiabatic lapse rates of moist and dry air, the air on the leeward slopes becomes warmer than equivalent elevations on the windward slopes. Föhn winds can raise temperatures by as much as 14 °C (25 °F) in just a matter of minutes. Central Europe enjoys a warmer climate due to the Föhn, as moist winds off the Mediterranean Sea blow over the Alps.

== See also ==
- Al Baydha Project
- Assisted natural regeneration
- Climate engineering
- Deforestation and climate change
- Desert greening
- Ecological engineering
- Evapotranspiration
- Forest restoration
- Great Green Wall, forest initiative in the African Sahel
- Great Plains Shelterbelt
- Moisture recycling
- Precipitationshed
- Restoration ecology
- Urban heat island
- Three-North Shelter Forest Program, also known as China's "Green Great Wall"
- Tropical rain belt
- Tropical rainforest conservation
- Water cycle
- Weather modification
