= Drinking Water Protection Zone =

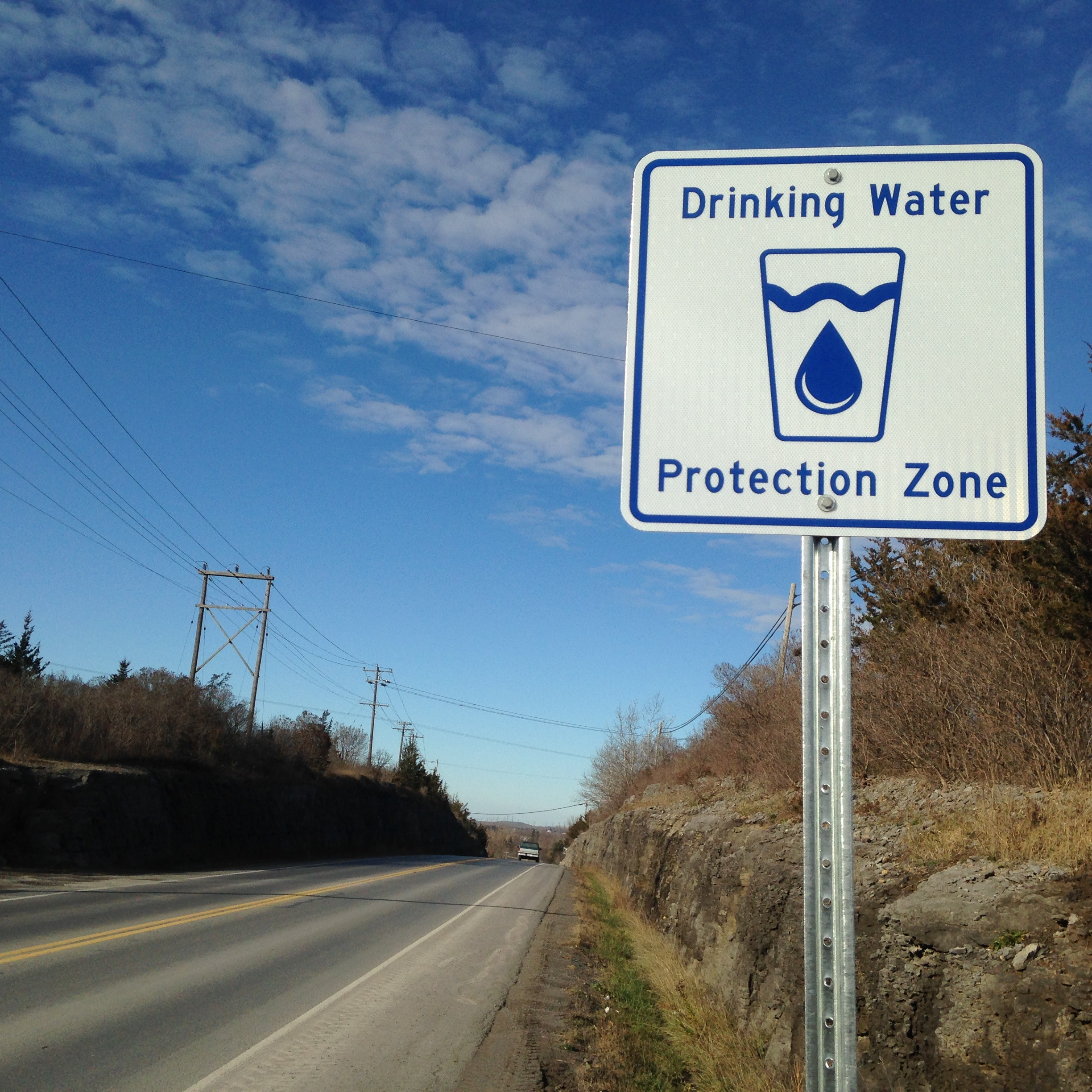
Road sign identifying vulnerable zones around a municipal drinking water system

Drinking Water Protection Zone is an official designation in the Canadian province of Ontario for areas that feed a well or municipal water supply. Road signs identify a “Drinking Water Protection Zone” with a graphic of a water glass. These signs are a standardized sign used across the province to indicate areas where a spill of toxic liquids including oil could impact a source of water for a municipal drinking water system.

The signs are part of a large effort in Ontario known as Drinking Water Source Protection. There are approximately 800 signs installed across the province.

== Criteria for location of road signs ==
The road signs indicate intake protection zones and wellhead protection areas around the municipal drinking water systems where a spill could be a significant drinking water threat. These zones were determined by calculating how quickly surface water and groundwater move toward municipal intakes and wells.

== Purpose of the signs ==
The primary purpose of the signs is to remind first responders the locations where a spill could impact a municipal drinking water source. In the event of a spill in the drinking water protection zones it is important to notify the appropriate authorities including the Ontario government's Spills Action Centre and the operators of the municipal drinking systems that a spill has occurred. It may be necessary for the operator to shut down the system so that contaminants do not enter the system.

A secondary purpose is to raise public awareness of the Source Protection Program. Many people do not know or consider where their water comes from and that human activities on the land can negatively impact the quality of the drinking water. It is therefore a key component of the overall education and outreach efforts of the Source Protection Committees across the province.

== History ==
The road sign was an initiative the Quinte Source Protection Committee, led by Chairman Max Christie, Project Manager Keith Taylor and GIS Expert Amy Dickens. Mark Nuefled, Chair of the Niagara Region Source Protection Committee also assisted in the effort. The Ontario Ministry of the Environment and the Ministry of Transportation were partners in the effort.The first sign was installed in Napanee, Ontario on November 16, 2015. The signs are now used across the province to mark vulnerable zones around municipal wells and intakes. There are over 2,100 signs currently used in the province. A bilingual version is used in areas near Quebec and areas with a high French demographic.
