= Line Gordon =

Swedish scientist

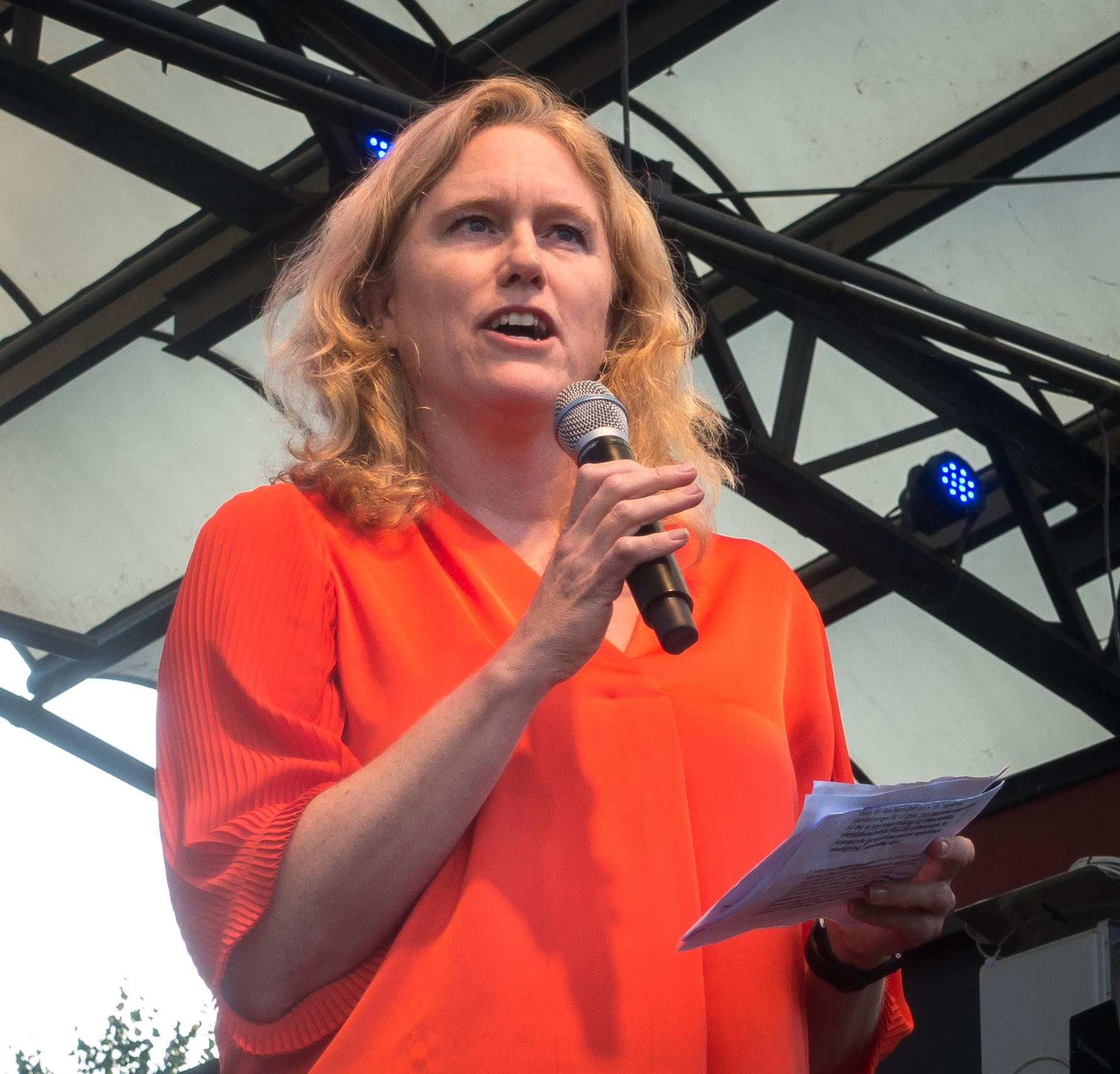
- Line Gordon speaking at the Fridays for Future climate demonstration on 27 September 2019 in Stockholm.
- Born: February 18, 1972 (age 54)
- Education: Stockholm University(PhD)
- Known for: Precipitationshed, moisture recycling, Planetary diet
- Scientific career
- Fields: ecohydrology, ecosystem services, food systems, earth system science
- Workplaces: Stockholm Resilience Centre, Stockholm University
- Thesis: Land Use, Freshwater Flows and Ecosystem Services in an Era of Global Change
- Doctoral advisors: Malin Falkenmark, Carl Folke
- Website: https://www.stockholmresilience.org/contact-us/staff/2008-01-08-gordon.html

Line Gordon (born Line Josefin Gordon, 18 February, 1972) is a Swedish sustainability scientist whose transdisciplinary research combines food, water, and the benefits people receive from nature. Gordon is the director of the Stockholm Resilience Centre and a professor at Stockholm University, Sweden. She is also on the board of the EAT foundation, and often participates in public discussions of food and climate in Sweden.

== Early life and education ==
Gordon, was born and raised in Stockholm, Sweden. She was a high school exchange student in Northern Australia, and a university exchange student in Burkina Faso. She studied biology as an undergraduate, and her interest in further study in ecology was sparked by a lecture by Carl Folke on how people are connected to ecosystems. This experience led her to contact him, and go on to study for a PhD with him at Stockholm University.

Gordon's PhD focused on the role of water in the biosphere at local and planetary scales. Her PhD was supervised by Carl Folke and Malin Falkenmark in Systems Ecology at Stockholm University. Gordon spent part of her PhD in Canberra, Australia collaborating with Australian scientists at CSIRO. The final paper from her thesis was the first assessment of how human land use change, especially deforestation and irrigation, had altered the flow of evaporative water into the atmosphere. Gordon earned her PhD in 2003 in Natural Resources Management, Department of Systems Ecology, Stockholm University for her dissertation "Land Use, Freshwater Flows and Ecosystem Services in an Era of Global Change." In 2004, her PhD was recognized Stiftelsen Kung Carl XVI Gustafs 50-års fond, an award for excellent PhDs.

== Career and research ==
Following her PhD, Gordon was a postdoctoral fellow at the International Water Management Institute (IWMI) in Colombo, Sri Lanka, where she worked with David Molden on the Comprehensive Assessment of Water Management in Agriculture. Following that, she returned to Stockholm University where she worked as a researcher, in 2006 at the Department of Systems Ecology and then in 2007 at the Stockholm Resilience Centre. She became an associate professor in 2012, and deputy director of the Stockholm Resilience Centre in 2013. She has also been a visiting researcher at CIRAD in France, McGill University in Canada, and STIAS – the Stellenbosch Institute for Advanced Study in Stellenbosch, South Africa.

In 2018, Gordon became the director of the Stockholm Resilience Centre. The Stockholm Resilience Centre is a partnership of Stockholm University and the Beijer Institute of Ecological Economics of the Royal Swedish Academy of Sciences. It is a large transdisciplinary sustainability research centre with about 150 staff, which has Masters and PhD programmes in sustainability science. In 2021, she was appointed the Curt Bergfors Professor in sustainable food systems.

Gordon's research has three main themes: research in Africa, water, and food. Gordon has had long-term research engagement in Africa. Over the past 15 years, she has conducted research in Burkina Faso, Tanzania, South Africa, Senegal, and Ghana. Gordon's research on water has focused on unravelling the critical roles of how the evaporation of water impacts water flows. With her PhD student Patrick Keys, she developed the concept of the precipitationshed. From her work on agriculture, Gordon moved on to the ecology of the food system, and she has increasingly collaborated with chefs and food producers. She is on the board of the EAT Foundation, and is one of the authors of the EAT-Lanet planetary health diet, which developed dietary guidelines that aim to provide healthy nutritious food to the world's people while limiting the damage of farming to the Earth's climate, nature, water.

Gordon's leadership on sustainable and healthy food was noted by the magazine Aktuell Hållbarhet, which considered her one of the 100 most powerful Swedish sustainability leaders, and she entered their top ten in 2021.

=== Notable publications ===
Gordon's most cited research has been on ecosystem services, food, and water. Her work has been published across a wide variety of journals spanning topics from global change, to food, and agro-ecosystems. Four of her most highly cited works are:

- Gordon, Line J.; Steffen, Will; Jönsson, Bror F.; Folke, Carl; Falkenmark, Malin; Johannessen, Åse (24 May 2005). "Human modification of global water vapor flows from the land surface". Proceedings of the National Academy of Sciences of the United States of America. 102 (21): 7612–7617. Bibcode:2005PNAS..102.7612G. doi:10.1073/pnas.0500208102. PMC 1140421. PMID 15890780.
- Gordon, Line J.; Peterson, Garry D.; Bennett, Elena M. (April 2008). "Agricultural modifications of hydrological flows create ecological surprises". Trends in Ecology & Evolution. 23 (4): 211–219. Bibcode:2008TEcoE..23..211G. doi:10.1016/j.tree.2007.11.011. PMID 18308425.
- Bennett, Elena M.; Peterson, Garry D.; Gordon, Line J. (December 2009). "Understanding relationships among multiple ecosystem services". Ecology Letters. 12 (12): 1394–1404. Bibcode:2009EcolL..12.1394B. doi:10.1111/j.1461-0248.2009.01387.x. PMID 19845725.
- Gordon, Line J.; Finlayson, C. Max; Falkenmark, Malin (April 2010). "Managing water in agriculture for food production and other ecosystem services". Agricultural Water Management. 97 (4): 512–519. Bibcode:2010AgWM...97..512G. doi:10.1016/j.agwat.2009.03.017.
