= Sahara Forest Project =

Reforestation and Ecology Project

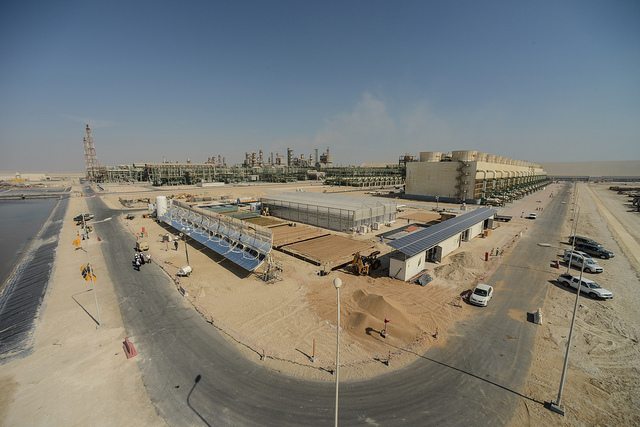
The Sahara Forest Project pilot facility in Qatar

The Sahara Forest Project aims to provide fresh water, food and renewable energy in hot, arid regions as well as re-vegetating areas of uninhabited desert. The founding team was composed of Seawater Greenhouse Ltd, Exploration Architecture, Max Fordham Consulting Engineers and the Bellona Foundation.

The proposed technology combines saltwater-cooled greenhouses with solar power technologies, either directly using photovoltaic (PV) or indirectly using concentrated solar power and technologies for desert revegetation. It is claimed that these technologies together will create a sustainable and profitable source of energy, food, vegetation and water. The scale of the proposed project is such that very large quantities of seawater would be evaporated. By using locations below sea level, pumping costs would be eliminated. A project in Qatar has been completed, and pilot projects in Jordan and Tunisia have been initiated.

== Pilot in Qatar ==
Sahara Forest Project's first pilot facility was built in Qatar and officially opened on 16 December 2012 by the then Heir Apparent Sheikh Tamim bin Hamad Al Thani. The results were better than expected. The results have guided next steps, namely a test and demonstration center providing the first commercial-scale of the full Sahara Forest Project value chain.

== Jordan agreement ==
On 22 June 2014, the Sahara Forest Project signed an agreement with the Norwegian Embassy in Amman for establishing a Sahara Forest Project Launch Station and related activities in Jordan. The Launch Station will be the first step towards a full-scale Sahara Forest Project Centre in Aqaba, Jordan. The Launch Station will contain a saltwater-cooled greenhouse in combination with solar power technologies and facilities for outdoor cultivation and revegetation. The Qatar plant was dismantled in 2016, and was opened in Jordan on September 7^{th} 2017 after being shipped.

Not all reports on the project are optimistic. Hydroponics projects globally tend to be overly optimistic but there are downsides to producing expensive crops in a population that cannot afford to buy them.

== See also ==
- Al Baydha Project
- Sahara
- Sundrop Farms; a partially similar project
- Wadi Rum Consultancy
- Great Green Wall (Africa)
