= Reinette Biggs =

South African scientist

Reinette "Oonsie" Biggs
- Born: 1979 (age 46–47); Windhoek, Namibia
- Education: University of South Africa (BSc); University of KwaZulu-Natal (BSc); University of the Witwatersrand (MSc); University of Wisconsin-Madison (PhD)
- Scientific career
- Fields: social-ecological systems, ecosystem services, sustainability
- Workplaces: Stellenbosch University; Stockholm University
- Thesis: Uncertainty, learning and innovation in ecosystem management (2008)
- Doctoral advisors: Stephen Carpenter
- Website: https://www0.sun.ac.za/cst/person/reinette-oonsie-biggs/

Professor Reinette "Oonsie" Biggs is a South African sustainability scientist whose research focuses on food, water, and the benefits people receive from nature. Biggs is the co-director of the Centre for Complex Systems in Transition at Stellenbosch University, South Africa and a researcher at Stockholm Resilience Centre, Stockholm University in Sweden.

== Early life and education ==
Biggs was born in Windhoek, Namibia in 1979. Her parents were veterinarians who starting doing research, and involved Biggs and her siblings. Her father then was hired to work in South Africa's Kruger National Park and her family moved to Skukuza Restcamp where she grew up surrounded by wildlife and research.

“Growing up in the Kruger National Park in South Africa as apartheid came to an end, Reinette (Oonsie) Biggs was confronted with a pressing question: Could her country's natural resources give people a chance to shake off poverty without undermining the resource base for future generations?”

Biggs studied Geography (BSc) at the University of South Africa and Applied Environmental Sciences (BScHons) at the University of Natal. She then completed a master's degree, “Assessing biodiversity intactness” in environmental sciences at the University of the Witwatersrand. Her Masters research lead to a development of a “biodiversity intactness index” with her advisor, Robert Scholes. This work, published in 2005, has since been widely used in analyses of changes in biological diversity. During this time she also worked on the Millennium Ecosystem Assessment, especially on Southern African Millennium Ecosystem Assessment (SAfMA) regional scale project. Following this work, she received a Fulbright Scholarship for doctoral studies in the US at the Center for Limnology, and obtained her doctorate in 2008 at the University of Wisconsin-Madison.

== Career and research ==
Following her PhD, Biggs moved to the Stockholm Resilience Centre, at Stockholm University. She was a post-doctoral researcher from 2008 to 2010, and a researcher from 2010 until the present. She received a Branco Weiss Society in Science Fellowship from 2010 to 2015. While at Stockholm Resilience Centre she founded the Regime Shifts Database with Garry Peterson. She is also a co-founder, along with Garry Peterson and Elena Bennett, of the Seeds of a Good Anthropocene project, that aims to analyze, create, and enable the creation of socially and ecologically just, desirable and sustainable futures.

In 2015, she was also awarded a South African Research Chair (SARChI) in Social-Ecological Systems and Resilience funded by the National Research Foundation (NRF), South Africa. She also became co- director of the Centre for Complex Systems in Transition at Stellenbosch University, which takes a transdisciplinary approach to sustainability science connecting policy, practice and local stakeholders. She also is co-chair of Future Earth core project the Program on Ecosystem Change and Society (PECS) and coordinates the Southern African Program on Ecosystem Change and Society (SAPECS).

Biggs work has been frequently cited, according to Google Scholar, she has over 100 scientific publications that have been cited over 46 000 times, with an H-index of 69. Her most cited research has been on biodiversity, regime shifts, and ecosystem services.
