= Wadi Rum Consultancy =

The Wadi Rum Consultancy of Wadi Rum Organic Farms, is an example of desert greening. Begun in 2010, it is located in historic Wadi Rum, in southern Jordan. Overseen by permaculture expert Geoff Lawton, it has established a sustainable agriculture system.

== Overview ==
The program has achieved success, primarily, by implementing principles of hydrological and permacultural design. The results of the consultancy have been documented in photographs, as well as in several videos.

== See also ==
- Al Baydha Project
- Sahara Forest Project
