= John D. Liu =

Sino-American ecologist

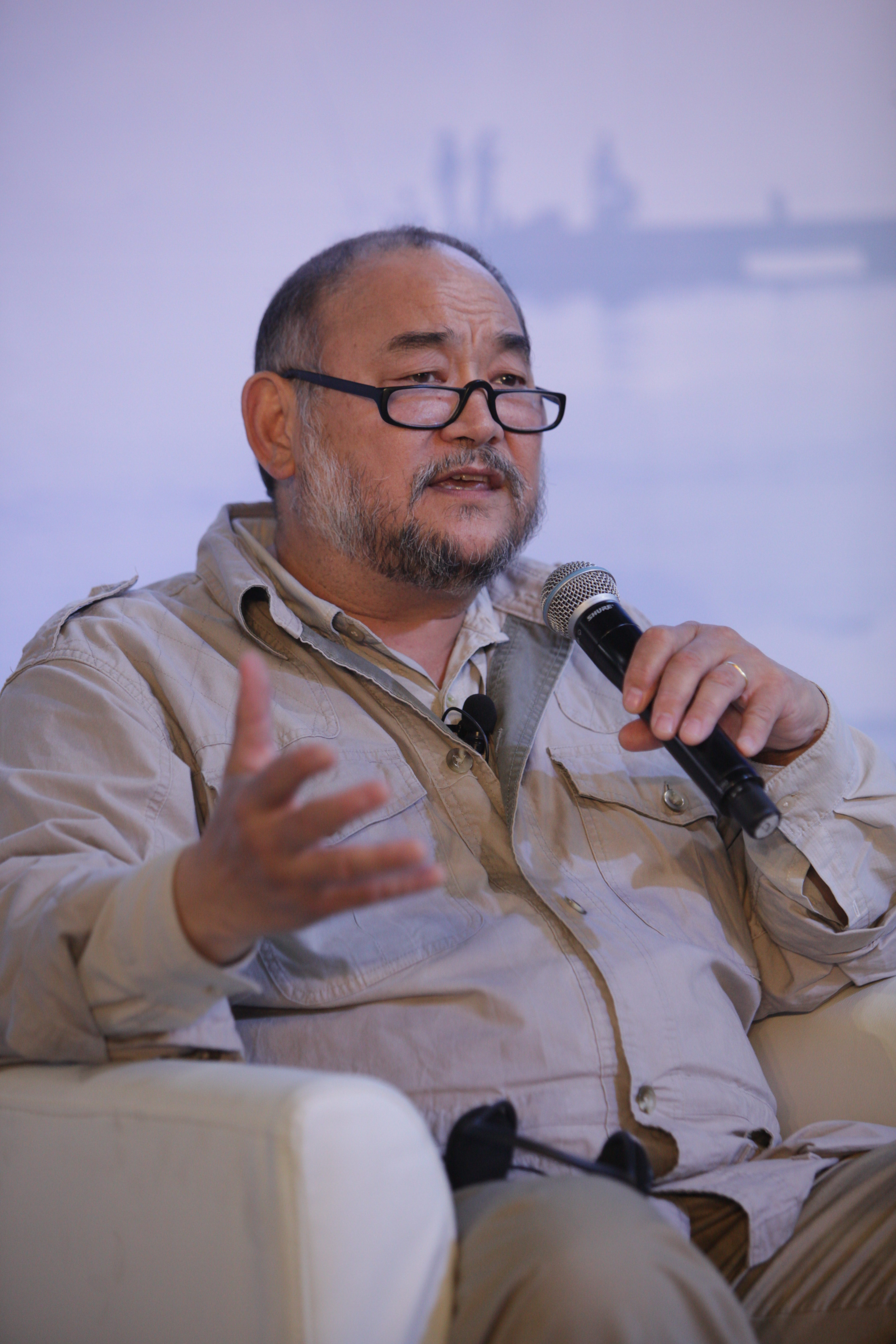
- Liu talking at the 2014 World Travel & Tourism Council's Global Summit in Hainan, China
- Born: 1953 (age 72–73); Nashville, Tennessee, United States
- Occupations: Film-maker, ecologist

John Dennis Liu (born 1953 in Nashville, Tennessee) is a Chinese American filmmaker and ecologist. He is also a researcher at several institutions. In January 2015, he was named Visiting Fellow at Netherlands Institute of Ecology (NIOO) of the Royal Netherlands Academy of Arts and Sciences. John is also Ecosystem Ambassador for the Commonland Foundation based in Amsterdam, Netherlands. In 2017, John Liu founded Ecosystem Restoration Camps, a worldwide movement that aims to restore damaged ecosystems on a large scale.

== Career ==
=== Early career ===
Liu was born in Nashville, Tennessee, United States, to a Chinese father and American mother. He spent most of his youth in Bloomington, Indiana. Liu studied journalism. In 1979, he went to China for the first time, after being pushed by his father to see his grandmother before her death. In China Liu helped set up the CBS News bureau in Beijing in 1981, at a time when tensions between the United States and China were lessening. He worked for CBS for more than ten years as a producer and cameraman. Liu has said that after the collapse of the Soviet Union he grew tired of journalism and wished to make films. He started working for European media such as RAI, SRG SSR, and ZDF. For RAI, ZDF, BBC World and National Geographic Channel he produced nature documentaries. In 1995, he filmed the Loess Plateau in China, which was being transformed from a barren and eroded ground into an oasis by the government. At this point, Liu noticed the possibility of humans restoring ecosystems, rather than only destroying them.

=== Ecological recovery and ideas ===
Liu retired from journalism in 1997 and became the director of the Environmental Education Media Project (EEMP). With the EEMP he uses television to provide information about ecology, sustainable development, public health in China and other countries. Liu emphasizes that the harmful effect of humans on the world is not only caused by greenhouse gasses, but is to a great extent caused by the destruction of biomass, organic matter and biodiversity. Liu claims that the decline in these factors has led to higher temperatures and loss of arable soil, in the end leading to desertification. Liu sees a solution for these problems in the way people look at money, as people currently value the products and services derived from ecosystems higher than the ecosystems themselves. The episode, Regreening the desert / Green gold of the show Tegenlicht, was aired by Dutch public broadcaster VPRO and co-produced by Liu. The episode sees Liu traveling to countries such as Jordan, China, and Ethiopia, showing the possibilities of re-greening areas that were turning into desert. At the 65th Prix Italia in September 2013, the episode won the Special Prize Expo 2015. Since 2009, Liu has been working with Willem Ferwerda, former director of the Dutch office of IUCN, executive fellow for business and ecosystems at the Rotterdam School of Management, Erasmus University, and founder of the Commonland Foundation, an organization that works on large-scale landscape restoration projects. John Liu founded Ecosystem Restoration Camps in 2017, a worldwide movement that aims to restore damaged ecosystems on a large scale.

=== Research ===
Liu was named Rothamsted International Fellow for the Communication of Science at Rothamsted Research, an agricultural research institution. He was also an associate professor at the Center for Climate and Society at George Mason University and a senior research fellow at the International Union for Conservation of Nature. In January 2015 John was named Visiting Fellow at the Netherlands Institute of Ecology (NIOO) of the Royal Netherlands Academy of Arts and Sciences. John is also Ecosystem Ambassador for the Commonland Foundation based in Amsterdam, Netherlands.

=== Writings ===
Liu has written for publications all over the world on a variety of topics, but he most consistently writes on the potential for the restoration of large-scale damaged ecosystems. He has written on ecosystem restoration for Kosmos magazine as well as for The Christian Science Monitor and for Forum for the Future in their Green Futures magazine. He has also written about the spiritual side of ecology and ecosystem restoration.

=== Hope in a Changing Climate ===
Hope in a Changing Climate was first screened in Copenhagen at COP 15 and on BBC World. Since its launch, Hope has been translated into French, German, Chinese, Vietnamese, Polish, Russian and Spanish. The film was officially chosen to commemorate the United Nations International Year of Forests, 2011. It was the most viewed video on the WaterChannel for more than 12 months in 2010 and 2011.

Hope won the Best Documentary Short Film Award at Green Screen in Vancouver, Canada, 2011. The International Festival of Environmental Film and Video accepted the film into its highly competitive global festival, June 2010. Hope was entered into United States: Best in Category: Ecosystem award in the prestigious International Wildlife Film Festival in Montana. In addition to the award for best ecosystem film, Hope also received six merit awards from IWWF (Presenter, Storytelling, Scientific Content, Conservation Initiative, Conservation Message and Human-Environment) in its 33rd annual film festival, May 2010, in Missoula, Montana.

=== Green Gold ===
In conjunction with Dutch public broadcasting company VPRO and Backlight, the film Green Gold followed Liu as he traverses the globe documenting and inspiring large-scale projects from China, Ethiopia, and Rwanda. Green Gold uses some footage from Hope In a Changing Climate, but includes additional footage from a trip to Jordan at the invitation of Princess Basma bint Talal, where he worked with permaculture designer Geoff Lawton at the Permaculture Research Institute of Jordan. In addition to Princess Talal and the Lawtons' thoughts (and projects), the documentary also features more of Liu's reflections on the regions he has visited. The film is also known as "Regreening the Desert," and is available as a streaming video from Films on Demand by Films Media Group at subscribing institutions.

== Filmography ==
- Jane Goodall - China Diary (2003), wrote, produced and directed
- Hope in a Changing Climate (2009), presented
- Lessons of the Loess Plateau wrote, produced and directed
- Scaling Up Poverty Reduction in China
- Beating the Drum Loudly
- A Line in the Sand
- Because They're Worth It
- The Long March
- Women of the Gobi
- Forests of Hope
- Forests Keep Drylands Working
- Food Security and Environmental Transformation in Ethiopia
- Emerging in a Changing Climate
- A Steppe Ahead
- The Next Steppe in Mongolia's Energy Future
- Leading With Agriculture

== See also ==
- Geoff Lawton
