= Stockholm Resilience Centre =

Swedish environmental research center

- Abbreviation: SRC
- Formation: January 1, 2007; 19 years ago
- Type: Research institute
- Purpose: A thriving and resilient biosphere that enables well-being for all.
- Headquarters: Stockholm, Sweden
- Official language: English
- Director: Line Gordon
- Website: stockholmresilience.org

Stockholm Resilience Centre (SRC) is a research centre at Stockholm University focused on resilience, sustainability science and social-ecological systems. Founded in 2007, it is a collaboration between Stockholm University and the Beijer Institute of Ecological Economics at the Royal Swedish Academy of Sciences. The centre has a particular focus on social-ecological resilience, where humans and nature are studied as an integrated whole.

Stockholm Resilience Centre states that its mission is to:

- advance the scientific understanding of the complex, dynamic interactions of people and nature in the Biosphere
- train the next generation of sustainability researchers and leaders
- engage in collaborations with change agents

Its research addresses sustainability challenges such as climate change, biodiversity loss, food systems and global financial markets. The centre advises policymakers and industry on ecosystem management and long-term sustainable and equitable development in Europe and elsewhere around the world.

== Organisation ==
Stockholm Resilience Centre was founded in 2007 with funding from Mistra by Johan Rockström and Carl Folke. The centre has approximately 160 staff. Line Gordon has been director of the centre since 2018.

Several researchers affiliated with the centre have been recognised among highly cited researchers. In 2025, five of the centre's researchers (Sarah Cornell, Max Troell, Johan Rockström, Garry Peterson, and Carl Folke), were included in the prestigious Clarivate list of the world's most cited researchers.

Stockholm Resilience Centre is governed by a board. It also receives strategic advice from two international advisory bodies. The International Scientific Advisory Council (ISAC) provides advice on the scientific development and direction of the centre and is led by Elena Bennett from McGill University. The International Advisory Board (IAB) provides strategic advice on the centre's efforts to connect knowledge to action towards global sustainability, particularly in business and policy, and is currently led by Jim Balsillie.

== Research ==
Stockholm Resilience Centre organises its research around four research areas:

- Conflict and collaboration in a hyperconnected world, which examines how democratic backsliding, political polarisation and violent conflicts affect the capacity to collaborate and transform toward sustainability.
- Anthropocene dynamics and capacities, which studies how human activities influence the functioning of the Earth's climate and ecosystems.
- Transformative futures, which focuses on systemic changes needed to address global challenges such as climate change, biodiversity loss, inequality, and technological disruptions.
- Doing sustainability research – the how, which examines methods for inter- and transdisciplinary research aimed at developing both theory and practical action.

The centre also works across five research topics: Ocean, finance, food, fresh water and AI and tech.

== Education ==
Stockholm Resilience Centre offers a PhD programme in Sustainability Science and a Master's programme in Social-Ecological Resilience for Sustainable Development. It also offers specialised courses, including an executive programme in resilience thinking aimed at CEOs and chairpersons, and a number of Stockholm University courses focused on global change, sustainable business, social-ecological resilience and systems theory.

== Notable work ==
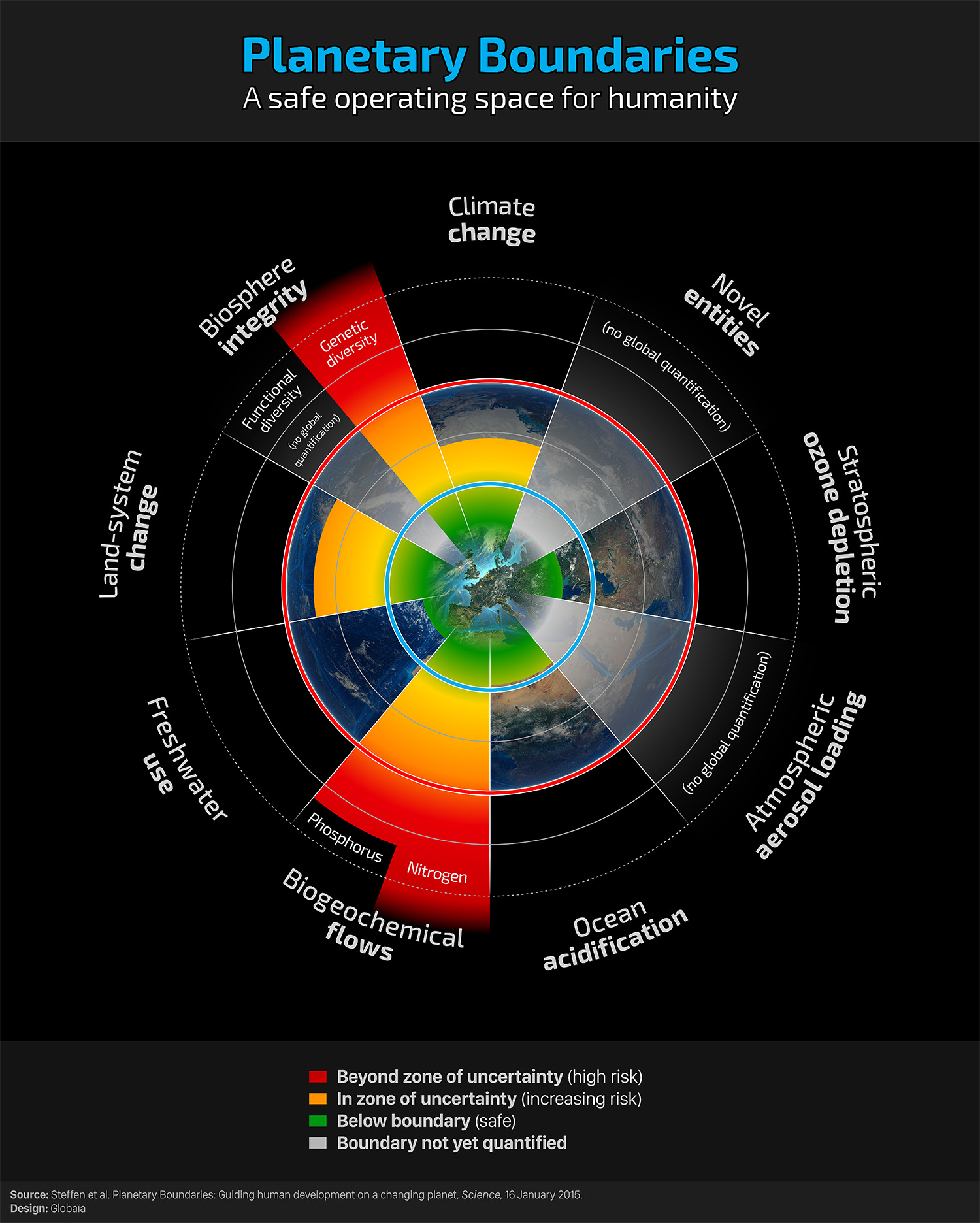
The nine planetary boundaries as of 2015

=== The Planetary Boundaries ===
The planetary boundaries framework was first proposed in 2009 by a group of 28 scientists led by Stockholm Resilience Centre's then director Johan Rockström. The framework identifies nine Earth system processes that are essential for human survival and proposes that these processes have boundaries that should not be crossed. The extent to which these boundaries are not crossed marks what the researchers call the safe operating space for humanity. Beyond these boundaries there is a risk of irreversible and abrupt environmental change which could make Earth less habitable.

The Planetary Boundaries framework was first published in Ecology & Society and later presented and discussed in Nature: A safe operating space for humanity. In the original assessment, the group attempted to quantify how far seven of the nine boundaries had already been pushed.

In 2015, the scientists published an update in Science. They changed the name of the boundary "loss of biodiversity" to "change in biosphere integrity" meaning that not only the number of species but also the functioning of the biosphere as a whole is important, and "chemical pollution" to "novel entities," including in it not only pollution but also organic pollutants, radioactive materials, nanomaterials, and microplastics. According to the 2015 update, four of the boundaries have been exceeded: climate change, loss of biosphere integrity, land-system change and altered biogeochemical cycles (phosphorus and nitrogen). By now, the concept of planetary boundaries had gained significant international media attention and was covered in, among others, the Economist and National Geographic.

In 2022, researchers concluded that the novel entity boundary had been exceeded.

In 2023, scientists assessed all nine planetary boundaries for the first time in an update published in Science Advances. They found that six of these boundaries had been crossed, with four of them posing a high risk. Additional to the crossed boundaries assessed in 2015, the freshwater change and novel entities boundaries had been crossed. A new study also shows the broad impact that the Planetary Boundaries framework has on society and science.

Since 2024, the Potsdam Institute for Climate Impact Research has used the planetary boundaries framework for its Planetary Health Check, updated yearly.

In 2025, ocean acidification was assessed as the seventh transgressed planetary boundary in the Planetary Health Check.

Development studies scholars have been critical of aspects of the framework, arguing that its adoption could place burdens on the Global South. Proposals to conserve a certain proportion of Earth's remaining forests can be seen as rewarding the countries such as those in Europe that have already economically benefitted from exhausting their forests and converting land for agriculture. In contrast, countries that have yet to industrialize are asked to make sacrifices for global environmental damage they may have had little role in creating.

==== Breaking Boundaries documentary ====
In 2021 Netflix released the documentary film Breaking Boundaries: the Science of Our Planet, directed by Jonathan Clay and presented by Sir David Attenborough and Johan Rockström. The 75-minute production follows the scientific journey of Rockström and his team's discovery of the nine planetary boundaries. Alongside the film's release, a book of the same name was published, with a foreword from Greta Thunberg.

=== The Planetary Health Diet ===
The Planetary Health Diet is a science-based global reference diet diet developed by the EAT-Lancet Commission to describe a dietary pattern that supports health while reducing pressure on the planetary boundaries. It was introduced in a report released in The Lancet on 16 January 2019, for which Stockholm Resilience Centre served as scientific coordinator.

The commission brought together 37 scientists to examine whether a future population of 10 billion people could be fed a healthy diet within planetary boundaries. The report concluded that this would be possible, but would require changes in diets, food production and food waste.

The diet is intended to be adaptable to different cultural and regional contexts. It emphasises with plant-based foods, including whole grains, fruits, vegetables, nuts and legumes, while recommending lower amounts of animal-based foods, refined grains, highly processed foods, and added sugars, and with unsaturated rather than saturated fats.

The 2025 EAT-Lancet Commission updated the framework by refining the Planetary Health Diet, setting food-system boundaries for all nine planetary boundaries and adding social foundations for a fair food system.

The 2019 report received significant media coverage, including features in the Guardian, CNN and BBC. It was also criticised on social media for advocating eating less meat. Later on, it was found that this critique was part of a concerted campaign started by pro-meat advocates a few days ahead of the launch of the report.

=== Doing business within Planetary Boundaries ===
The report "Doing business within Planetary Boundaries" was launched in 2024 by Stockholm Resilience Centre. It was presented at Norrsken, Europes biggest hub for tech and impact, in Barcelona. The report provides a tool that allows businesses to report their environmental impacts more accurately and with less effort. To do this the report presents two variables:

- Essential Environmental Impact Variables (EEIVs): assess the most important environmental impacts of companies in a standardized manner (what, where and how much impact)
- Earth System Impact score (ESI): a science-based tool to investigate companies impact beyond the primary focus of carbon

=== Planetary Communications ===
In June 2026, Stockholm Resilience Centre launched Planetary Communications, a handbook for sustainability science communication. The handbook draws on the Planetary Boundaries framework and the centre's experience communicating sustainability research.

The handbook was developed with contributions from researchers, communicators, and creatives, including Johan Rockström. It outlines nine principles for communicating climate and environmental science: be factful, simplifying, timing communication wisely, linking messages to other societal concerns, making communication actionable, highlighting solutions, navigating emotions, making issues personal, and using visual communication.

=== Other ===
- Stockholm Resilience Centre was the co-founder and a scientific partner of SeaBOS, a science-industry collaboration involving major seafood. Initiated in 2016, SeaBOS announced in July 2026 that the formal collaboration would wind down.
- The centre has hosted two international science conferences on resilience and sustainability in 2008 and 2017.
- In 2011 it hosted the third Nobel Laureate Symposium on global sustainability together with the Royal Swedish Academy of Sciences, Stockholm Environment Institute, the Beijer Institute of Ecological Economics, and the Potsdam Institute for Climate Impact Research.
- In 2021 the first Nobel Prize Summit was hosted by the Nobel Foundation and organised by the US National Academy of Sciences in partnership with the Potsdam Institute for Climate Impact Research and Stockholm Resilience Centre/Beijer Institute of Ecological Economics.

== Specialist programmes ==
- Global Resilience Partnership
- SwedBio
