= Geoff Lawton =

Australian permaculture consultant

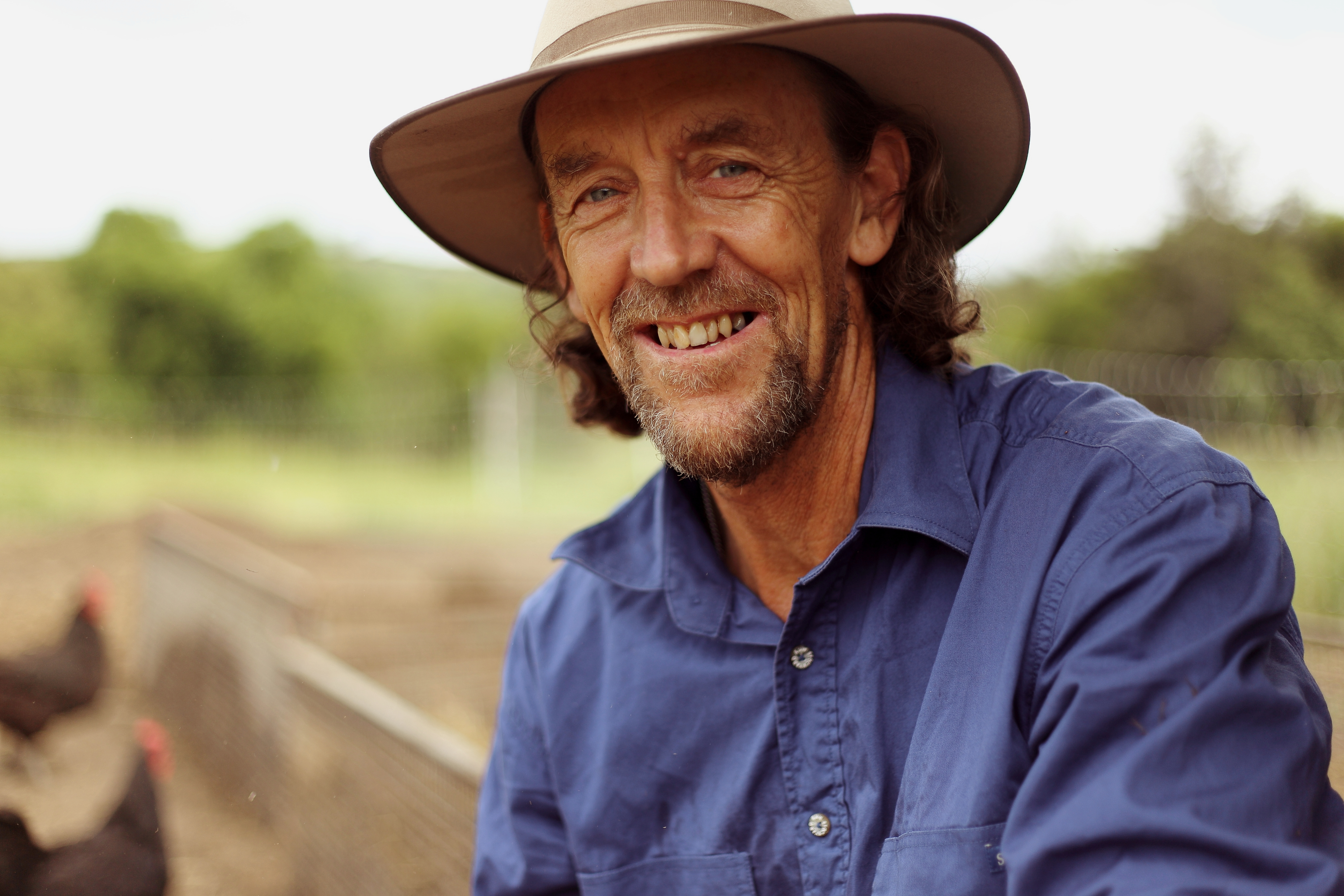
- Lawton, 2015
- Born: 10 December 1954 (age 71); Stoke-on-Trent, Staffordshire, England
- Citizenship: Australia
- Children: Danial Lawton
- Scientific career
- Fields: Permaculture, agriculture
- Website: geofflawtononline.com

Geoff Lawton (born 10 December 1954) is a British-born Australian permaculture consultant, designer, teacher and speaker. Since 1995 he has specialized in permaculture education, design, implementation, system establishment, administration and community development.

== Career ==
Since 1985, Lawton has undertaken a large number of jobs consulting, designing, teaching and implementing in over thirty countries around the world. Clients have included private individuals, groups, communities, governments, aid organisations, non-governmental organisations and multinational companies.

Lawton's aim is to establish self-replicating educational demonstration sites. He has educated over 15,000 students in permaculture worldwide. These include graduates of the Permaculture Design Certificate (PDC) Course and courses focused on the practical design of sustainable soil, water, plant, animal, energy, structures, legal and economic systems. Lawton's 'master plan' is to see aid projects being replicated as fast as possible to help ameliorate the growing food and water crisis.

In 1996 he was accredited with the Permaculture Community Services Award by the permaculture movement for services in Australia and around the world.

In October 1997 Bill Mollison, upon his retirement, asked Lawton to establish and direct a new Permaculture Research Institute on the 66 hectare Tagari Farm developed by Mollison. Lawton further developed the site over three years and established The Permaculture Research Institute Australia as a not for profit company. PRI was eventually moved to Zaytuna Farm, in The Channon, where it continues today.

Lawton is the managing director of The Permaculture Research Institute Australia and The Permaculture Research Institute USA, a registered not for profit organisation that has tax deductible gift recipient status. Establishing sustainable aid projects as permaculture demonstration sites that also function as education centres for local and international students has become a major focus with the establishment of permaculture research institutes in Jordan, Afghanistan, Spain, Malaysia, Vietnam, Yemen, United Arab Emirates, Morocco, Thailand, China and many more countries underway.

Lawton and Mollison have taught a number of courses together. Lawton is also a presenter in Mollison's teaching DVD set.

Lawton is friends with John D. Liu, a Chinese-American film-maker and ecologist who documented large scale ecological recovery in the Loess Plateau, China after a government project set to rehabilitate an area the size of Belgium. Lawton appears in Liu's documentary Hope in a Changing Climate.

Recently, Lawton has achieved success in establishing a permaculture ecosystem in Wadi Rum, in southern Jordan. He has also helped to begin the Al Baydha Project, a land restoration program, in western Saudi Arabia.

On 31 March 2012 Lawton appeared at TEDx conference in Ajman.

In 2019 Lawton opened enrollment to his online PDC 2.0, which began January 30 and, lasting 28 weeks, will be the longest course he has taught.

== Works ==
- Lawton, Geoff. "Brick and Tile Permaculture" (PDF). Permaculture International Journal No. 51. Archived from the original (PDF) on 16 April 2019.
- "The Sleeping Jaguar" (co-author), Permaculture International Journal
- "Ecuador" (co-author), Permaculture International Journal
- "Permaculture Aid in the Balkans", Permaculture International Journal
- "Future Food Security", Green Connections

== Films ==
- Harvesting Water the Permaculture Way (2007)
- Establishing a Food Forest (2008)
- Introduction to Permaculture Design (2009)
- Greening The Desert II (2009)
- Permaculture Soils (2010)
- Urban Permaculture (2011)
- Green is the new Silver (Lining): Crisis, Hope, and Permaculture (2019)

== Awards ==
- The Permaculture Research Institute Australia won the Humanitarian Water & Food Award for 2010 for their initiative "Greening the Desert".
- The Permaculture Research Institute and founder Geoff Lawton, based in Australia, were the 2015 winners of the Energy Globe Award.
- The Permaculture Research Institute recognised with UNCCD Accreditation

== See also ==
- Forest gardening
- Bill Mollison
