= Tropical rainforest conservation =

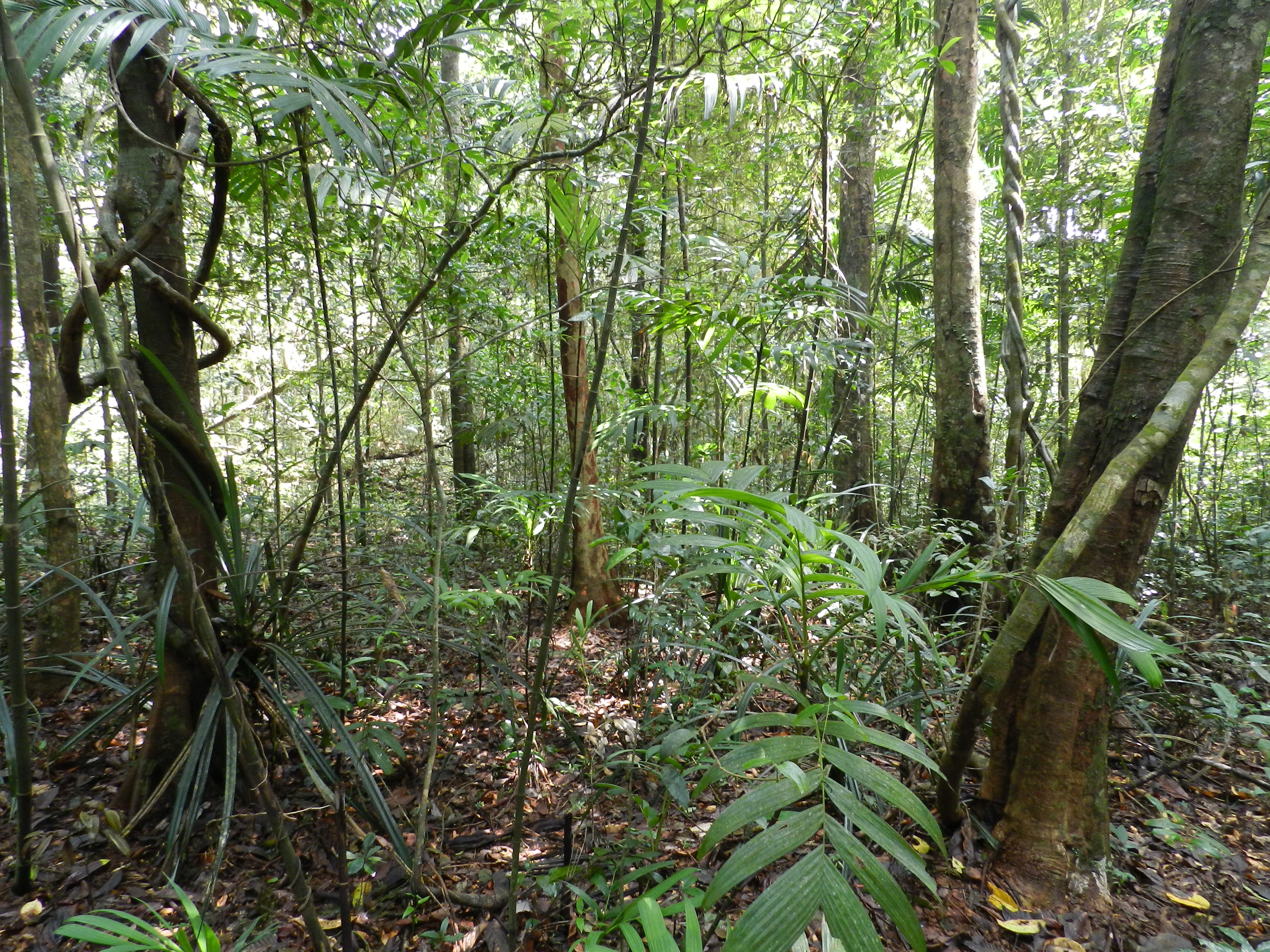
Tropical rainforest in Agumbe, India

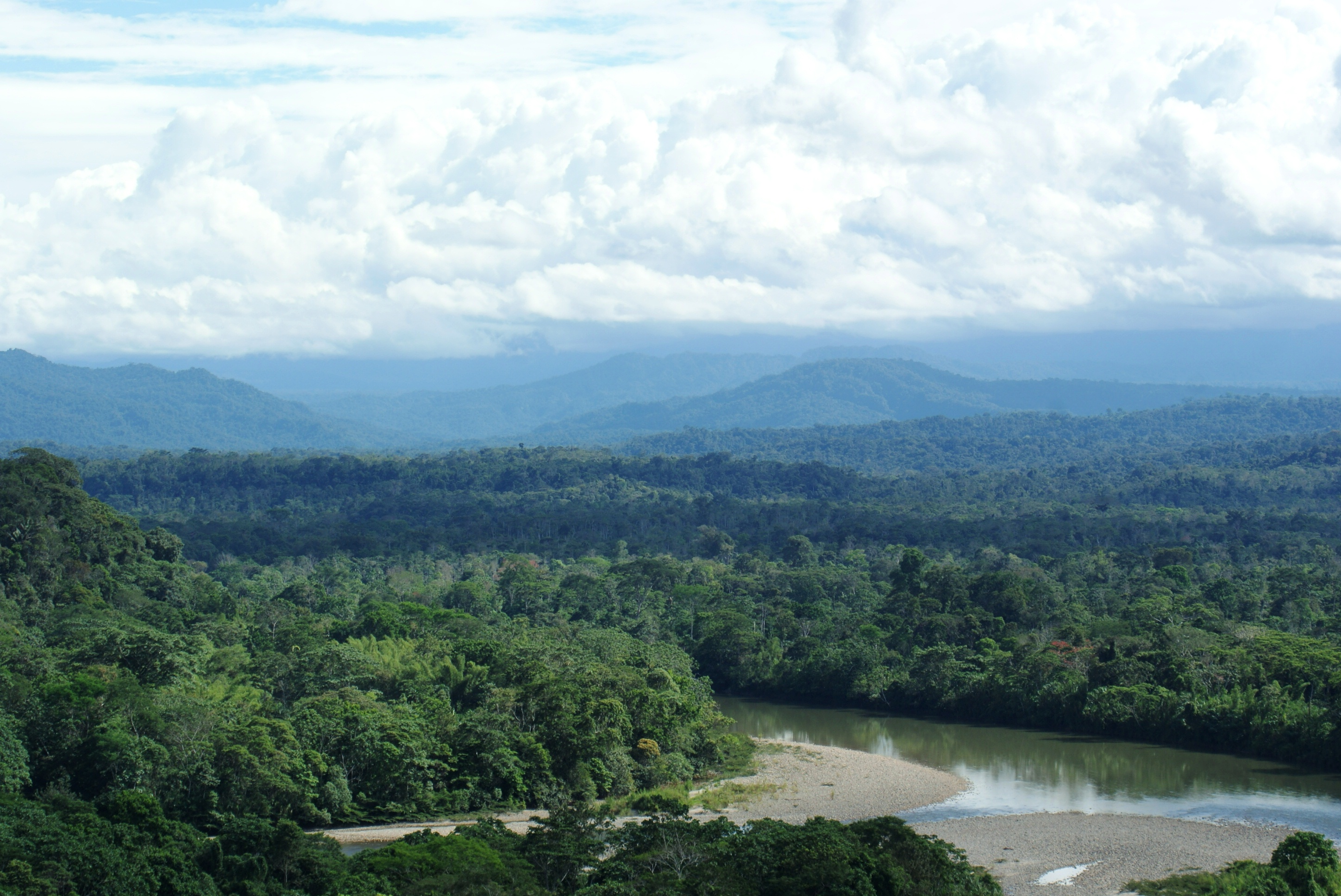
Amazon rainforest

Tropical rainforest map

Building blocks for tropical rainforest conservation include ecotourism and rehabilitation. Reforestation and restoration are common practices in certain areas to try to increase tropical rainforest density. By communicating with the local people living in, and around, the rainforest, conservationists can learn more about what might allow them to best focus their efforts. Rainforests are globally important to sustainability and preservation of biodiversity. Although they may vary in location and inhabited species of plants and animals, they remain important worldwide for their abundance of natural resources and for the ecosystem services. It is important to take into consideration the differing species and the biodiversity that exists across different rainforest types in order to accurately implement methods of conservation.

== Rehabilitation and restoration efforts ==
=== Conservation methods ===
Tropical rainforest conservation currently holds many different forms around the world. In Asian countries, including Vietnam, the Philippines, Indonesia, and China, the governments play a major role in restoration efforts. Governments may implement and provide funds for projects, which usually include planting fast-growing trees. This had led to some success, however the extent of success is not clear. This contrasts with efforts predominately executed by South American countries such as Peru and Brazil. In these, the government takes a less direct role. Instead, it provides incentives to farmers to reduce deforestation, which may take the form of tax credits. In addition to this, many local, small scale projects are embraced rather than large, government-ran ones.

=== Keys to successful restoration ===
One of the most impactful ways in which forest restoration can be carried out successfully is by identifying "restoration hotspots," or areas that give restoration efforts the greatest chance for success. These areas are defined as places in which restoration offers the highest socioeconomic benefits and a place in which restoration is feasible. These are important to take into account because in many cases, for an individual property owner, engaging in deforestation brings him more benefit than preservation.

The four components that make up restoration benefits are the conservation of biodiversity, the effectiveness of reducing climate change, climate change adaptation, and improving human water security. In addition, restoration feasibility is made up of three parts: the opportunity cost of changing land from agricultural back to rainforest, how well the forest is capable of recovering, and the chance that the restored forest will persist in the future. Based on these criteria, over 863 Mha of rainforest around the globe qualifies as a "restoration hotspot." Brazil contains nearly one third of all global hotspots, while other significant contributors include Indonesia, India, Madagascar, and Colombia.

In addition to identifying restoration hotspots, local organization and participation is essential for ensuring that conservation efforts are successful. The socioeconomic needs of the local population thus needs to be considered when implementing restoration plans, in order to increase civilian support and long-term regrowth.

=== Bonn challenge ===
The Bonn Challenge is a deal signed in 2011 by 58 countries who originally pledged to restore 150 million hectares (Mha) of forest by 2020. By the year 2020, over 170 Mha had been pledged to be restored by 63 countries. This was later reaffirmed to restore 350 Mha by the year 2030. The challenge recognized that, while reforestation initiatives exist, they are far outpaced by levels of deforestation. Thus, its goals include to reduce this gap in order to restore rainforests around the world and, by doing so, improving biodiversity and human lives. The pledge works in conjunction with a wide range of other international initiatives. These include the Convention on Biological Diversity, the Sustainable Development Goals, the UN Framework Convention on Climate Change, African Forest Landscape Restoration Initiative and Initiative 20x20, among others.

== Ecotourism ==
Ecotourism is conducting tours of a specific area in efforts to teach the public about often threatened environments. It is a practice that represents one imperative solution to saving endangered habitat. Tourists and tour guides alike often make generous donations to conservation efforts in the regions they visit, greatly helping the preservation of the Amazon rainforest. Experts are continuously and commonly discussing with conservationists, policy-makers, and local politicians and leaders about ecotourism and its impacts on surrounding ecosystems. Ecotourism can contribute to the conservation and sustainability of biodiversity in rainforests. Many of the tropical field stations are visited by tourists and the general public, by students and volunteers and of 142 field stations surveyed received a total of ~11,055–18,950 visitors per year Ecotourism has also shown to give way towards accessing an environmental economic growth. Studies have shown that ecotourism has given way towards conservation of ecological biodiversity.

== Amazon rainforest ==
The Amazon rainforest in South America is one of the world's largest and most dense rainforests. Rainforests are disappearing across the world, especially in Brazil. Since the 1980s, more than 153,000 square miles were deforested. Brazil has helped feed the growing global demand for food supply of soybeans and beef with the newly cleared land. Brazil has worked to immensely slow the destruction of its rainforests, reducing the rate of deforestation by over 80%.

Implementing stricter land use regulations has somehow slowed down the degree of Deforestation a bit, and creating protected areas. Greenhouse gas emissions, largely due to the alarming rates of rainforest destruction, are one of the largest contributors to climate change in the Amazon region. The national government of Brazil aids better social and economic planning of specific areas with significant similarities with national policies. In 2009 alone, Brazil acknowledged an issue and accepted the challenge presented to reduce its carbon emissions by 36–38 percent by 2020 in efforts to in turn reduce the amounts of gases being emitted into the air.

== Carbon credits ==
Another way conservation has become the most economically beneficial option is through carbon credits. Under the Kyoto Protocol, countries must reduce their emissions of carbon dioxide by 5% below the 1990 levels before 2012. Countries can meet their mandatory cuts in emissions by offsetting some of those emissions some other way. Through conservation or reforestation of the rainforest, countries can receive credits.

Some worldwide companies have stated publicly that they refuse to purchase products that originate from recently cleared areas of the rainforest. Beef commonly comes from farms that are located on land previously inhabited by rainforests.

== See also ==
- Sustainability
- Environmental economics
- Global drying
- Tropical and subtropical moist broadleaf forests
