= Surface-water hydrology =

Sub-field of hydrology concerned with above-earth water

Surface-water hydrology is the sub-field of hydrology concerned with above-earth water (surface water), in contrast to groundwater hydrology that deals with water below the surface of the Earth. Its applications include rainfall and runoff, the routes that surface water takes (for example through rivers or reservoirs), and the occurrence of floods and droughts.

Surface-water hydrology is used to predict the effects of water constructions such as dams and canals. It considers the layout of the watershed, geology, soils, vegetation, nutrients, energy and wildlife. Modelled aspects include precipitation, the interception of rain water by vegetation or artificial structures, evaporation, the runoff function and the soil-surface system itself.

When surface water seeps into the ground above bedrock, it is categorized as groundwater, and the rate at which this occurs determines baseflow needs for instream flow, as well as subsurface water levels in wells. While groundwater is not part of surface-water hydrology, it must be taken into account for a full understanding of the behaviour of surface water.

Glacial hydrology is a part of surface-water hydrology; some of the runoff from glaciers and snow also involves groundwater hydrology concepts.

== See also ==
- Hydrological transport model
- Moisture recycling
