= Surface water =

Water located on top of land forming terrestrial bodies of water

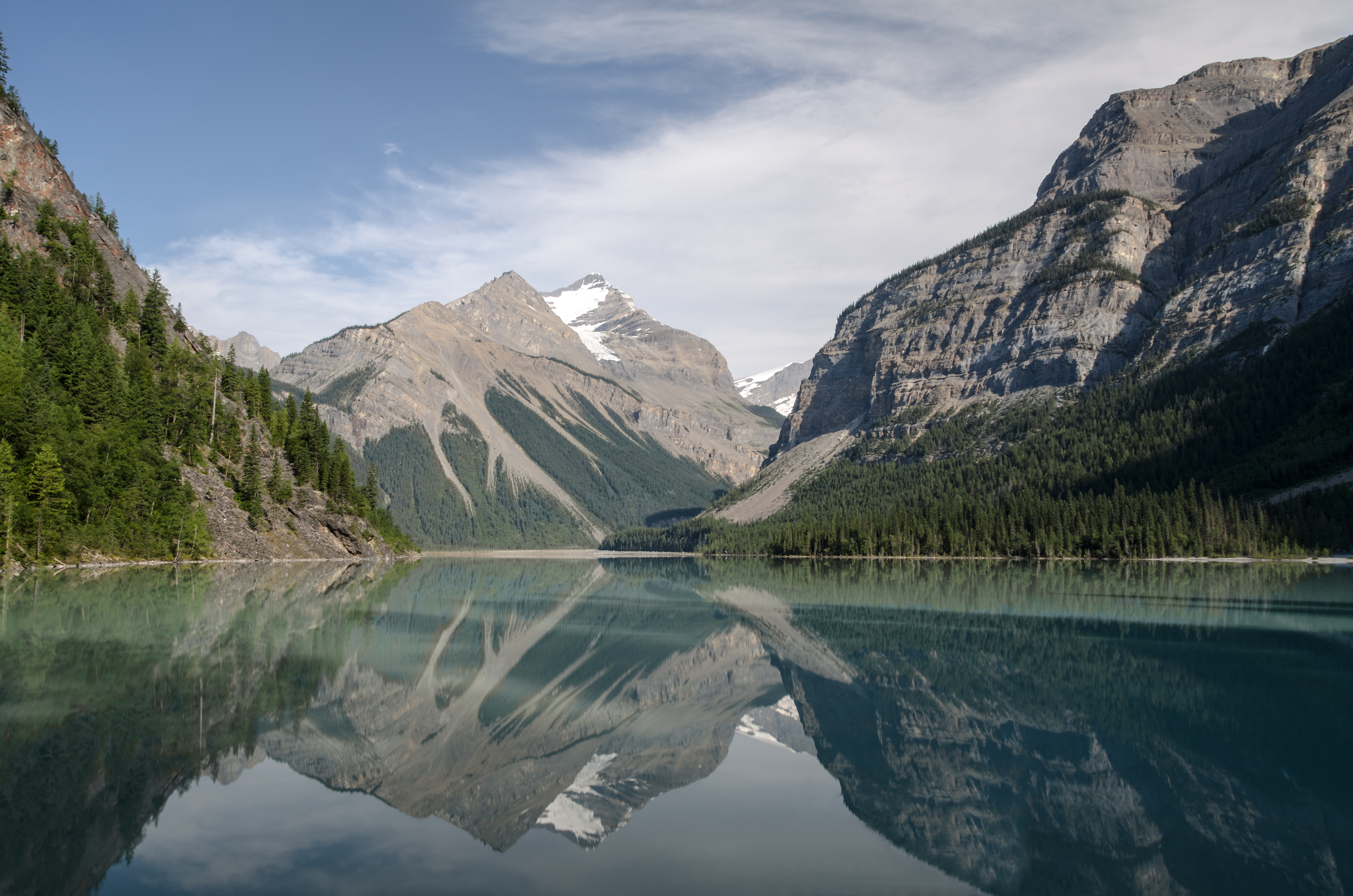
An inland lake, an example of surface water

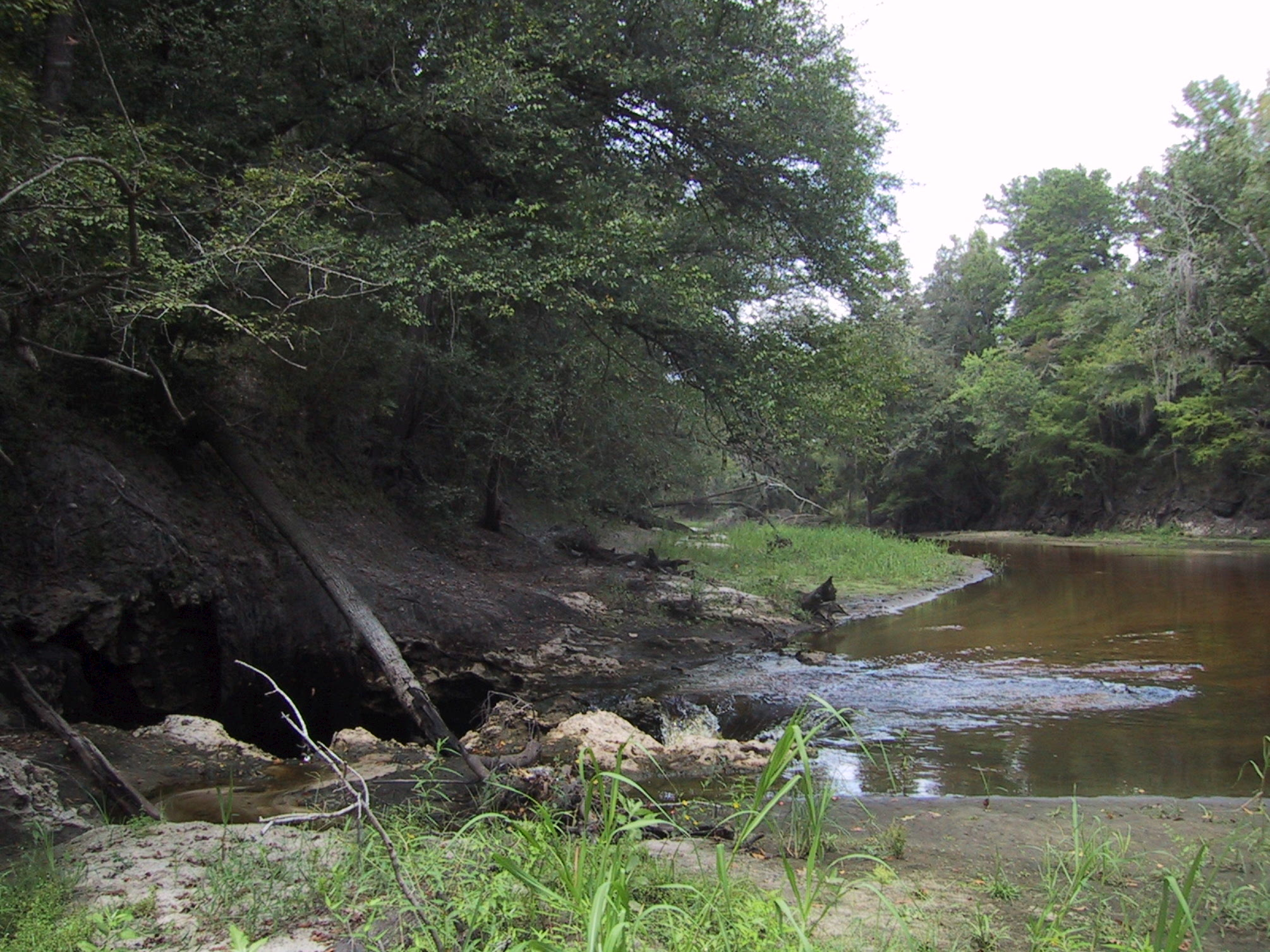
The entire surface water flow of the Alapaha River near Jennings, Florida, going into a sinkhole leading to the Floridan Aquifer groundwater

Surface water is liquid water located on top of land, forming open-air waterbodies surrounded by dry land on all sides. Surface water include all streams (rivers, creeks and brooks), lakes, ponds and wetlands, as well as temporary collections such as watering holes and puddles. Most surface water is fresh water (containing less than 1,000 mg/L of dissolved solids, as considered by USGS reports), although brackish, saline and even briny surface water also exist in the forms of tidal rivers, lagoons, saltwater/hypersaline lakes and inland seas.

The vast majority of surface water is produced by precipitation and seasonal glacial meltwater from the highlands, while the remainder are contributed by daylighted groundwater such as springs and seeps. Compared to the ocean, terrestrial surface water has significantly wider and more volatile variations in water level, temperature and chemical qualities, as well as vastly different floral and faunal assemblages.

Surface water is an important component of the Earth's water cycle. Evaporated water vapor from the ocean is convected towards inland via onshore breezes and monsoons, and the air mass experiences adiabatic cooling due to orographic lift, causing the moisture to condense into aerosol droplets, which eventually falls down to the land surface as rain (most commonly), snow, ice pellets or hail depending on local air temperature and weather conditions. The precipitated water then either runs off the surface and collects into various surface waterbodies, seeps down under the soil into the aquifer, or freezes into in solid forms stored in the cryosphere as river ice, snowpack and glacial ice accumulations. As the climate warms after the winter passes, liquid water released from glacial ice melt and snowmelt flows down the terrain towards nearby streams, which merge onto larger rivers, ponds and stream pools. Stream water often reaches the ocean, although it may also collect into an endorheic lake inside an enclosed depression.

The water cycle can cause rapid surges and inundations of the surrounding land area during the wet season, spring and summer. These streams then flow via depressed courses into larger bodies of water, until the surface water finally reaches the ocean (carrying significant quantities of dissolved minerals and insoluble sediments, which supply nutrients for planktons in marine coastal ecosystems) and repeats in further rounds of evaporation and precipitation. The scientific study of these surface water movements is known as surface-water hydrology, and is an important academic field in both civil engineering and environmental engineering as well as in urban planning and flood management.

Surface water is essential for freshwater ecosystems, and is also crucial for sustaining terrestrial ecosystems as nearly all terrestrial animals (including humans) require drinking water, which is typically procured from surface water. For human societies, access to surface water such as lakes and rivers contribute the predominant portion of water supply and is a major influencing factor for the pattern of settlement from major civilizations to tribal hamlets throughout both the prehistory and recorded history. Alongside being used directly for drinking and cooking, surface water is also used for agricultural irrigation and livestock watering, for aquaculture (as farm water), for cleaning, washing and sanitation, as industrial water for the manufacturing, pharmaceutical and chemical industries, for hydropower (e.g. watermills, trompes and, in the modern era, hydroelectricity), for waterborne transportation, and for recreation (e.g. water sports and recreational fishing). The management and treatment of surface water and proper disposal of both household, agricultural and industrial wastewaters back into the surface water system are important for maintaining adequate drinking water quality standards and reducing water pollution and eutrophication, which are harmful to the environment and the sustainability of human water security and fisheries.

There are three major types of surface water. Permanent (perennial) surface waters are present year round, and includes lakes, rivers and wetlands (marshes and swamps). Semi-permanent (ephemeral) surface water refers to bodies of water that are only present at certain times of the year including seasonally dry channels such as creeks, lagoons, watering holes and retarding basins. Human-made surface water are an engineered water bodies that are part of the infrastructures assembled by humans, which include dammed reservoirs, canals, ditches and aqueducts, retention ponds, garden ponds and reflection pools. The surface water held by dams can be used for renewable energy in the form of hydropower. Hydropower is the forcing of surface water sourced from rivers and streams to produce energy.

Large collection of surface water (i.e. large lakes and inland seas) may also be referred to as blue water as they often display a bluish color due to scattering and preferential absorption of the red spectrum, although the term is more often associated with seawater regions beyond the neritic zone (i.e. the open ocean) while surface water is often described as "brown water" instead.

== Measurement ==
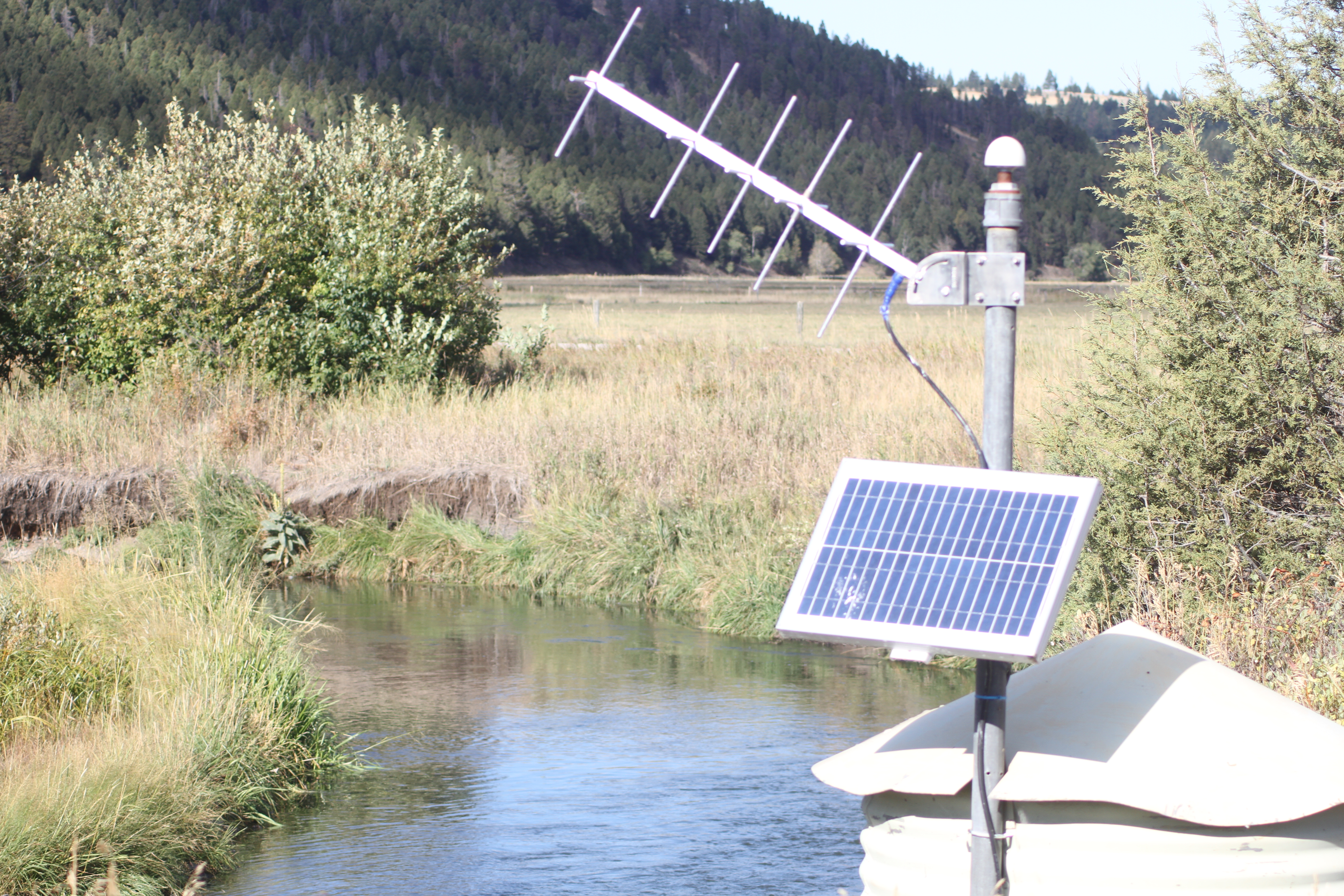
A stream gauge used to measure surface water

Surface water can be measured as annual runoff. This includes the amount of rain and snowmelt drainage left after the uptake of nature, evaporation from land, and transpiration from vegetation. In areas such as California, the California Water Science Center records the flow of surface water and annual runoff by utilizing a network of approximately 500 stream gages collecting real time data from all across the state. This then contributes to the 8,000 stream gage stations that are overseen by the USGS national stream gage record. This in turn has provided to date records and documents of water data over the years. Management teams that oversee the distribution of water are then able to make decisions of adequate water supply to sectors. These include municipal, industrial, agricultural, renewable energy (hydropower), and storage in reservoirs.

== Impacts of climate change ==
Due to climate change, sea ice and glaciers are melting, contributing to the rise in sea levels. As a result, salt water from the ocean is beginning to infiltrate our freshwater aquifers contaminating water used for urban and agricultural services. It is also affecting surrounding ecosystems as it places stress on the wildlife inhabiting those areas. It was recorded by the NOAA in the years 2012 to 2016, ice sheets in Greenland and the Antarctic reduced by 247 billion tons per year. This number will continue to increase as global warming persists.

Climate change has a direct connection with the water cycle. It has increased evaporation yet decreased precipitation, runoff, groundwater, and soil moisture. This has altered surface water levels. Climate change also enhances the existing challenges we face in water quality. The quality of surface water is based on the chemical inputs from the surrounding elements such as the air and the nearby landscape. When these elements are polluted due to human activity, it alters the chemistry of the water.

== Conjunctive use of ground and surface water ==
Surface and groundwater are two separate entities, so they must be regarded as such. However, there is an ever-increasing need for management of the two as they are part of an interrelated system that is paramount when the demand for water exceeds the available supply. Depletion of surface and ground water sources for public consumption (including industrial, commercial, and residential) is caused by over-pumping. Aquifers near river systems that are over-pumped have been known to deplete surface water sources as well. Research supporting this has been found in numerous water budgets for a multitude of cities.

Response times for an aquifer are long. However, a total ban on ground water usage during water recessions would allow surface water to retain better levels required for sustainable aquatic life. By reducing ground water pumping, the surface water supplies will be able to maintain their levels, as they recharge from direct precipitation, surface runoff, etc.

It is recorded by the Environmental Protection Agency (EPA), that approximately 68 percent of water provided to communities in the United States comes from surface water.

== See also ==
- Environmental persistent pharmaceutical pollutant
- Meltwater
- Optimum water content for tillage
- Water resources
- Surface-water hydrology
