= Precipitationshed =

Upwind source of evaporation to a given location's precipitation

In meteorology, a precipitationshed is the upwind ocean and land surface that contributes evaporation to a given, downwind location's precipitation. The concept has been described as an "atmospheric watershed". The concept itself rests on a broad foundation of scholarly work examining the evaporative sources of rainfall. Since its formal definition, the precipitationshed has become an element in water security studies, examinations of sustainability, and mentioned as a potentially useful tool for examining vulnerability of rainfall dependent ecosystems.

Overview of a precipitationshed

== Concept ==
In an effort to conceptualize the recycling of evaporation from a specific location to the spatially explicit region that receives this moisture, the precipitationshed concept was expanded to the evaporationshed. This expanded concept has been highlighted as particularly useful for providing a spatially explicit region for examining the impacts of significant land-use change, such as deforestation, irrigation, or agricultural intensification.

== See also ==
- Water cycle
- Moisture recycling
- Line Gordon
