= Elena Bennett =

American systems ecologist (born 1972)

Elena M. Bennett
- Born: June 12, 1972 (age 54); Camp Hill, Pennsylvania
- Education: Oberlin College (BA); University of Wisconsin-Madison (MSc, PhD)
- Known for: Ecosystem services, Good Anthropocene, Sustainability
- Scientific career
- Workplaces: McGill University; Gund Institute for Ecological Economics
- Thesis: Patterns of soil phosphorus: concentrations and variability across an urbanizing agricultural landscape (2002)
- Doctoral advisor: Stephen R. Carpenter
- Website: http://bennettlab.weebly.com/

Elena M. Bennett (born 1972) is an American ecosystem ecologist specializing in studying the interactions of ecosystem services on landscape. She is currently a Professor and the Canada Research Chair (Tier 1) in Sustainability Science at McGill University. She was inducted to the Royal Society of Canada’s College of New Scholars, Artists, and Scientists in 2017. She was elected a member of the National Academy of Sciences in 2022 and became a Guggenheim Fellow in the same year.

== Education ==
Bennett completed her Bachelor of Arts cum laude in biology and environmental studies with a minor in chemistry at Oberlin College. She then moved on to the University of Wisconsin-Madison where she obtained her Master of Science in land resources in 1999 and her PhD in limnology and marine sciences in 2002. Her PhD thesis, under the supervision of Stephen R. Carpenter, was on patterns of soil phosphorus across urban, suburban and agricultural landscapes.

== Career ==
Bennett accepted a post-doctoral research position at the University of Wisconsin–Madison (2002–2005) where she coordinated the Scenarios Working Group of the Millennium Ecosystem Assessment. In 2005, she accepted a position as Assistant Professor at McGill University in the Department of Natural Resource Sciences and McGill (later Bieler) School of Environment. She has been an Associate Professor since 2012. She is also the Canada Research Chair in Sustainability Science. In addition to teaching courses in ecology and environmental sustainability, she has been a research supervisor for over 60 undergraduate and graduate students, and post-doctoral researchers. Since 2014, Bennett was appointed as an affiliate at the Gund Institute (University of Vermont). Bennett has also given several lectures across the United States and Canada, including Cornell University, Pennsylvania State University, Virginia Tech, Columbia University, Dalhousie University, University of Guelph, and Universite de Sherbrooke, among others. She has published over 110 peer-reviewed papers, earning her an H-index of 53.

In addition to her academic contributions, Bennett is a member of several editorial boards, advisory councils, and ecological societies. She has been an editorial board member for Frontiers in Ecology and Environment since 2010. Bennett is also a lead author on the IPBES Global and Regional reports. She was the Co-chair for EcoSERVICES, a FutureEarth project, between 2014 and 2019. This project involved investigating the impact of biodiversity changes on ecosystem services and human health. Bennett has been on the advisory boards for the Leopold Leadership Program since 2015, the Resilience Alliance since 2018, and on the Scientific Advisory Panel for the Geneva Global Initiative since 2019. Bennett is also on the International Scientific Advisory Council for the Stockholm Resilience Centre (2019–2022). She has been on the Board of Directors for the Beijer Institute of Ecological Economics from 2017. In 2018, she gave a TEDxCERN talk on the Seeds of Good Anthropocenes.

She has reviewed papers in some of the world's top academic journals including Science, Nature, and PNAS. Bennett has also been a reviewer for several scholarship and grants, including the WWF Kathryn Fuller Fellowship for postdoctoral students, NSERC, and FQRNT.

== Research contributions ==
The research in her lab centers around ecosystem services and human impacts on managing landscapes more sustainably. Some of the large themes in her lab include agricultural, urban, and aquatic ecosystem services, anthropogenic impacts, and Good Anthropocenes. For example, her research revealed the maximum amount of phosphorus that can accumulate in watersheds before reaching aquatic ecosystems. She is co-founder, along with Garry Peterson and Oonsie Biggs, of the Seeds of a Good Anthropocene project, where emerging strategies are developed to engage in a more prosperous and optimistic future. Additionally, in collaboration with colleagues at McGill University, she helped develop a modelling framework that links the interconnectivity between land use, biodiversity and ecosystem services. This contributed to the design and application of a green belt for Montreal.

Her research also involves improving the modelling of ecosystem services by synthesizing existing understanding and by identifying key gaps. This helps progress the understanding and usefulness of nature to decision-makers in policy who require this information. Bennett is also the lead researcher on the NSERC ResNet Network. This research network monitors and models ecosystem services in landscapes across Canada with focuses on food, energy, timber, carbon storage, flood regulation, recreation and spiritual enhancement.

== Personal life ==
Elena Bennett is married to Jeffrey Cardille, also a professor in the Natural Resource Sciences Department at McGill University. They have two children together.

== Awards and honours ==
Bennett has won over $10 million in funding going towards her research lab at McGill University. Among over 30 awards, grants, and fellowships, she was also the recipient of the NSERC Strategic Network Grant in 2019. Here, she received $5.5 million for the NSERC ResNet project. In 2016, she was the recipient of the NSERC E.W.R. Staecie Memorial Fellowship.

In 2017, she became a member of the College of New Scholars, Artists and Scientists of the Royal Society of Canada (2017–2024). In 2016, she won the Alice Johannsen Award from the Mont Saint-Hilaire Nature Centre for her contributions towards the protection of nature. Between 2013 and 2018, she was a member of the Global Young Academy. In 2013, Bennett was awarded the Trottier Public Policy Fellowship in relation to the Montérégie Connection Project. She received the prestigious Leopold Leadership Fellowship in 2012 and the Guggenheim Fellowship in 2022. At McGill University, she has won several awards for teaching excellence, graduate supervision, and sustainability contributions to the campus and community. In 2022, she was elected to the US National Academy of Sciences, the fourth faculty from McGill University to do so.

== Selected recent publications ==
- Chaplin-Kramer, R, RP Sharp, C Weil, EM Bennett, U Pascual, AL Vogl, KK Arkema, KA Brauman, AD Guerry, NM Haddad, M Hamann, P Hamel, JA Johnson, L Mandle, HM Pereira, S Polasky, M Ruckelshaus, MR Shaw, JM Silver, GC Daily. 2019. Global Modeling of Nature's Contributions to People. Science 366: 255–258.
- Rieb, JT, R Chaplin-Kramer, GC Daily, PR Armsworth, K Böhning-Gaese, A Bonn, GS Cumming, F Eigenbrod, V Grimm, BM Jackson, A Marques, SK Pattanayak, HM Pereira, GD Peterson, TH Ricketts, BE Robinson, M Schröter, LA Schulte-Moore, R Seppelt, MG Turner, and EM Bennett. 2017. When, where, and how much does nature matter? BioScience 67(9): 820–833.
- Bennett, E.M., M. Solan, R. Biggs, T. MacPhearson, A. Norstrom, P. Olsson, L. Pereira, G. D. Peterson, C. Raudsepp-Hearne, F. Beirmann, S. R. Carpenter, E. Ellis, T. Hichert, V. Galaz, M. Lahsen, B. Martin-Lopez, K. A. Nicolas, R. Preisser, G. Vince, J. Vervoort, and J. Xu. 2016. Bright Spots: Seeds of a Good Anthropocene. Frontiers in Ecology and Environment 14(8): 441–448.
- Bennett, E. M., W. Cramer, A. Begossi, G. Cundill, B. Egoh, I. R. Geijzendorffer, C. B. Krug, S. Lavorel, L. Lebel, B. Martin-Lopez, P. Meyfroidt, H. A. Mooney, J. L. Nel, U. Pascual, K. Payet, N. Perez Harguindeguy, G. D.Peterson, A-H., Prieur-Richard, B. Reyers, P. Roebeling, R. Seppelt, M.Solan, P. Tschakert, T. Tschntke, B. L. Turner, P. H. Verburg, E. Viglizzo, P. C.L. White, and G. Woodward. 2015. Linking biodiversity, ecosystem services and human well-being for sustainability: Three Challenges for designing research for sustainability. Current Opinion in Environmental Sustainability 14:76-85.
- Haberman, D & Bennett, EM. 2019. Ecosystem service bundles in global hinterlands. Environmental Research Letters 14: 084005.

== Professional positions ==
- Canada Research Chair Tier 1 in Sustainability Science, McGill University, Montreal, Quebec, Canada (2019-2026)
- Professor, cross-appointed at Bieler School of Environment and Department of Natural Resource Sciences, McGill University, Montreal, Quebec, Canada (2020–present)
- Associate professor, cross-appointed at Bieler School of Environment and Department of Natural Resource Sciences, Montreal, Quebec, Canada (2012 – 2019)
- Affiliate, Gund Institute, University of Vermont, Burlington, Vermont, USA (2014 – present)
- Assistant professor, McGill School of Environment, McGill University, Montreal, Quebec, Canada (2005 – 2012)
