= Moisture recycling =

Aspect of hydrology

In hydrology, moisture recycling or precipitation recycling refer to the process by which a portion of the precipitated water that evapotranspired from a given area contributes to the precipitation over the same area. Moisture recycling is thus a component of the hydrologic cycle. The ratio of the locally derived precipitation (P_{L}) to total precipitation (P) is known as the recycling ratio, ρ:
$$\rho = \frac{P_L}{P}.$$

The recycling ratio is a diagnostic measure of the potential for interactions between land surface hydrology and regional climate. Land use changes, such as deforestation or agricultural intensification, have the potential to change the amount of precipitation that falls in a region. The recycling ratio for the entire world is one, and for a single point is zero. Estimates for the recycling ratio for the Amazon basin range from 24% to 56%, and for the Mississippi basin from 21% to 24%.

The concept of moisture recycling has been integrated into the concept of the precipitationshed. A precipitationshed is the upwind ocean and land surface that contributes evaporation to a given, downwind location's precipitation. In much the same way that a watershed is defined by a topographically explicit area that provides surface runoff, the precipitationshed is a statistically defined area within which evaporation, traveling via moisture recycling, provides precipitation for a specific point.

== See also ==
- Water cycle
- Precipitationshed
- Land surface effects on climate
- Al Baydha Project
