= Al Baydha Project =

Desert greening project, Saudi Arabia

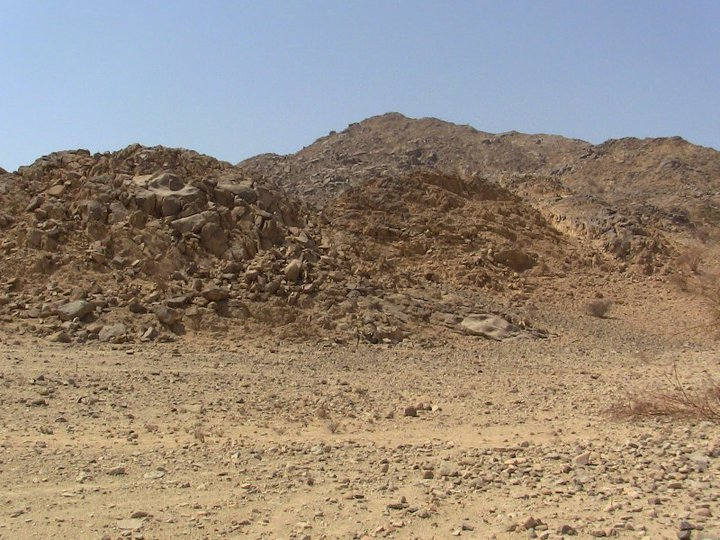
Terraces at the Al Baydha project, Saudi Arabia - before.

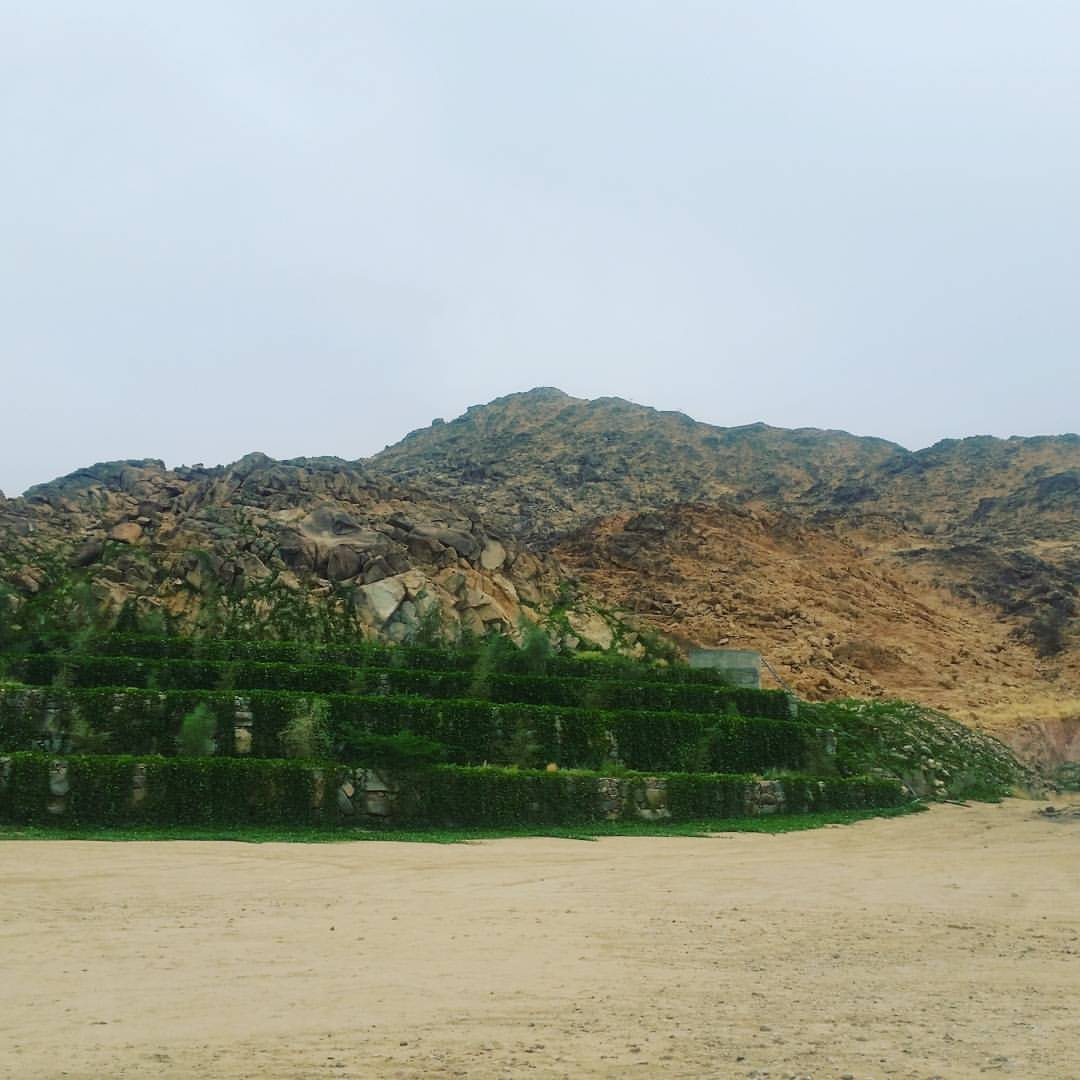
Terraces at the Al Baydha project, Saudi Arabia - after.

The Al Baydha Project in rural, western Saudi Arabia, is a land restoration, poverty-alleviation, and heritage preservation program, based on principles of permacultural and hydrological design. Located roughly 50 km (31 mi) south of Mecca, in Makkah Province, Al Baydha is an area characterized by the rocky, arid, foothills of the Hijaz Mountains. Arab tribes are the major residents of this region.

Founded in 2009 by Princess Haifa Al-Faisal, Harvard ethicist Mona Hamdy, and Stanford permaculturist Neal Spackman, Al Baydha has begun to see practical and ecological results.

== Project goals ==
Most notably, Al Baydha's emphasis is on creating an economy for the inhabitants of Al Baydha that is socially, culturally, environmentally, and economically sustainable. The project's main objective is to create financial and social independence for the inhabitants by training, educating and employing them in the infrastructure and capacity building activities undertaken by the Al Baydha Project.

Al Baydha's environmental goal is the reversal of desertification. This is accomplished largely via rainwater harvesting, through utilization of rock terraces and gabions (or small check dams), as well as catchment of runoff into swale lines. These support afforestation of drought-resistant trees, such as date palms, in the natural landscape. Another focus of the program is on slowing down flash floods in the highlands, and, over time, converting them into seasonal streams or wadis. In the long-term future, Al Baydha hopes to transform the region into a savanna ecosystem, in part, by means of assisted natural regeneration, conservation grazing, and the effects of evapotranspiration and atmospheric moisture recycling.

== Site development after the end of artificial irrigation ==
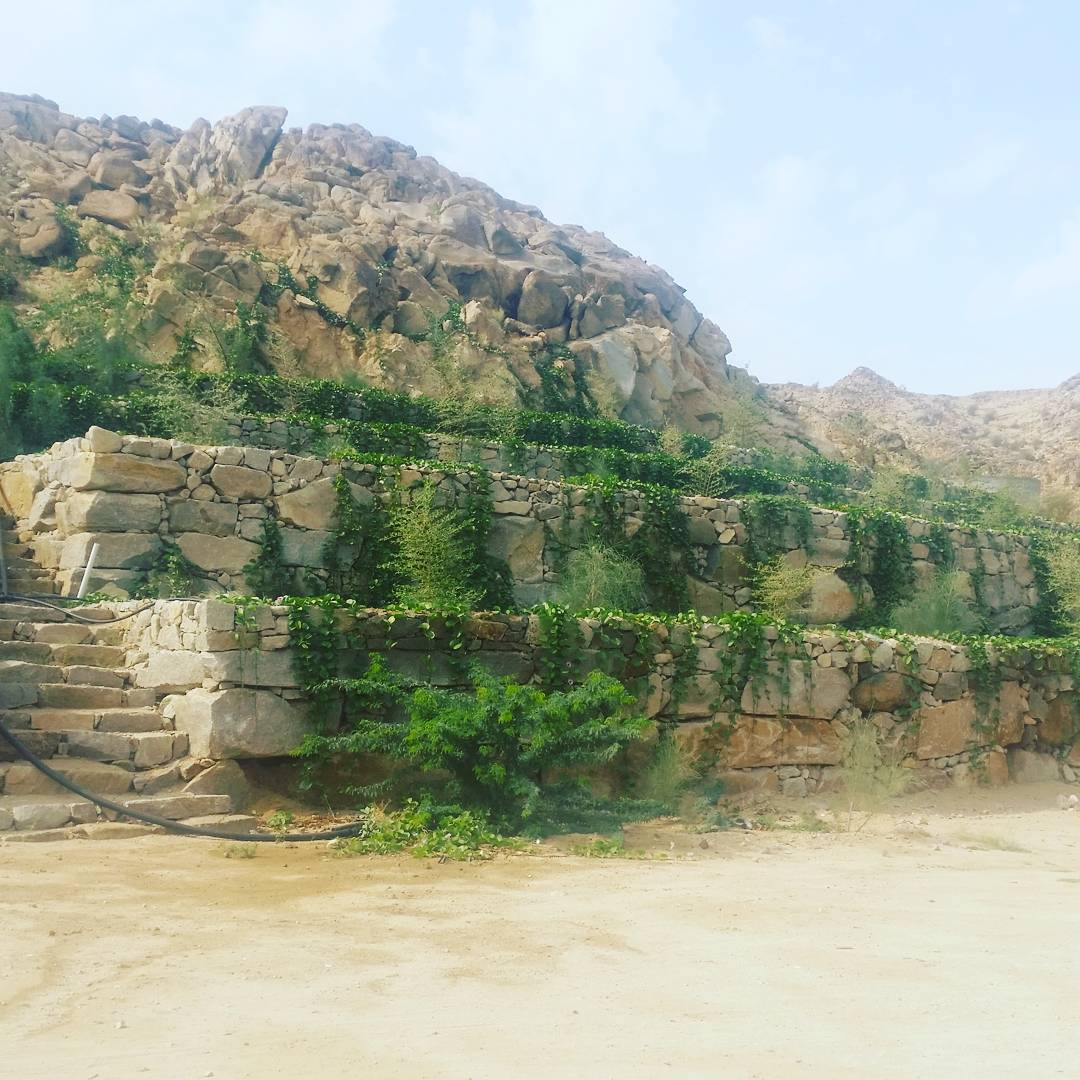
Detail of the dry wall terraces at the Al Baydha project, Saudi Arabia.

In 2016, the Al Baydha Project received a commendation from Prince Khaled Al Faisal for innovative work undertaken by the inhabitants of Al Baydha as a model of national excellence in humanitarianism, sustainability, and innovation. The same year funding stopped and Neal Spackman needed to shut off water to the irrigation pipes. The trees started to die. He told those involved in the project that the true test would be to see if the trees could live without being watered. Later that winter the trees survived and thrived, proving testament to the power of ancient terrace farming.

In a 2020 documentary about the Al Baydha Project, Spackman has called the project "a testament to the potential of regenerative agricultures and a template for the reforestation of millions of desert landscapes in the Arabian peninsula and beyond."

== Similar projects ==
A similar project, overseen by permaculturist Geoff Lawton (who advised on the design of Al Baydha), has already achieved success in Wadi Rum, in southern Jordan.
