= Fish DNA barcoding =

DNA barcoding methods for fish are used to identify groups of fish based on DNA sequences within selected regions of a genome. These methods can be used to study fish, as genetic material, in the form of environmental DNA (eDNA) or cells, is freely diffused in the water. This allows researchers to identify which species are present in a body of water by collecting a water sample, extracting DNA from the sample and isolating DNA sequences that are specific for the species of interest. Barcoding methods can also be used for biomonitoring and food safety validation, animal diet assessment, assessment of food webs and species distribution, and for detection of invasive species.

In fish research, barcoding can be used as an alternative to traditional sampling methods. Barcoding methods can often provide information without damage to the studied animal.

Aquatic environments have unique properties that affect how genetic material from organisms is distributed. DNA material diffuses rapidly in aquatic environments, which makes it possible to detect organisms from a large area when sampling a specific spot. Due to rapid degradation of DNA in aquatic environments, detected species represent contemporary presence, without confounding signals from the past.

DNA-based identification is fast, reliable and accurate in its characterization across life stages and species. Reference libraries are used to connect barcode sequences to single species and can be used to identify the species present in DNA samples. Libraries of reference sequences are also useful in identifying species in cases of morphological ambiguity, such as with larval stages.

eDNA samples and barcoding methods are used in water management, as species composition can be used as an indicator of ecosystem health. Barcoding and metabarcoding methods are particularly useful in studying endangered or elusive fish, as species can be detected without catching or harming the animals.

== Applications ==
=== Ecological monitoring ===
Biomonitoring of aquatic ecosystems is required by national and international legislation (e.g. the Water Framework Directive and the Marine Strategy Framework Directive). Traditional methods are time-consuming and include destructive practices that can harm individuals of rare or protected species. DNA barcoding is a relatively cost-effective and quick method for identifying fish species aquatic environments. Presence or absence of key fish species can be established using eDNA from water samples and spatio-temporal distribution of fish species (e.g. timing and location of spawning) can be studied. This can help discover e.g. impacts of physical barriers such as dam construction and other human disturbances. DNA tools are also used in dietary studies of fish and the construction of aquatic food webs. Metabarcoding of fish gut contents or feces identify recently consumed prey species. However, secondary predation must be taken into consideration.

=== Invasive species ===
Early detection is vital for control and removal of non-indigenous, ecologically harmful species (e.g. lion fish (Pteroissp.) in the Atlantic and Caribbean). Metabarcoding of eDNA can be used to detect cryptic or invasive species in aquatic ecosystems.

=== Fisheries management ===
Barcoding and metabarcoding approaches yield rigorous and extensive data on recruitment, ecology and geographic ranges of fisheries resources. The methods also improve knowledge of nursery areas and spawning grounds, with benefits for fisheries management. Traditional methods for fishery assessment can be highly destructive, such as gillnet sampling or trawling. Molecular methods offers an alternative for non-invasive sampling. For example, barcoding and metabarcoding can help identifying fish eggs to species to ensure reliable data for stock assessment, as it has proven more reliable than identification via phenotypic characters. Barcoding and metabarcoding are also powerful tools in monitoring of fisheries quotas and by-catch.

eDNA can detect and quantify the abundance of some anadromous species as well as their temporal distribution. This approach can be used to develop appropriate management measures, of particular importance for commercial fisheries.

=== Food safety ===
Globalisation of food supply chains has led to an increased uncertainty of the origin and safety of fish-based products. Barcoding can be used to validate the labelling of products and to trace their origin. "Fish fraud" has been discovered across the globe. A recent study from supermarkets in the state of New York found that 26.92% of seafood purchases with an identifiable barcode were mislabelled.

Barcoding can also trace fish species as there can be human health hazards related to consumption of fish. Further, biotoxins can occasionally be concentrated when toxins move up the food chain. One example relates to coral reef species where predatory fish such as barracuda have been detected to cause Ciguatera fish poisoning. Such new associations of fish poisoning can be detected by the use of fish barcoding.

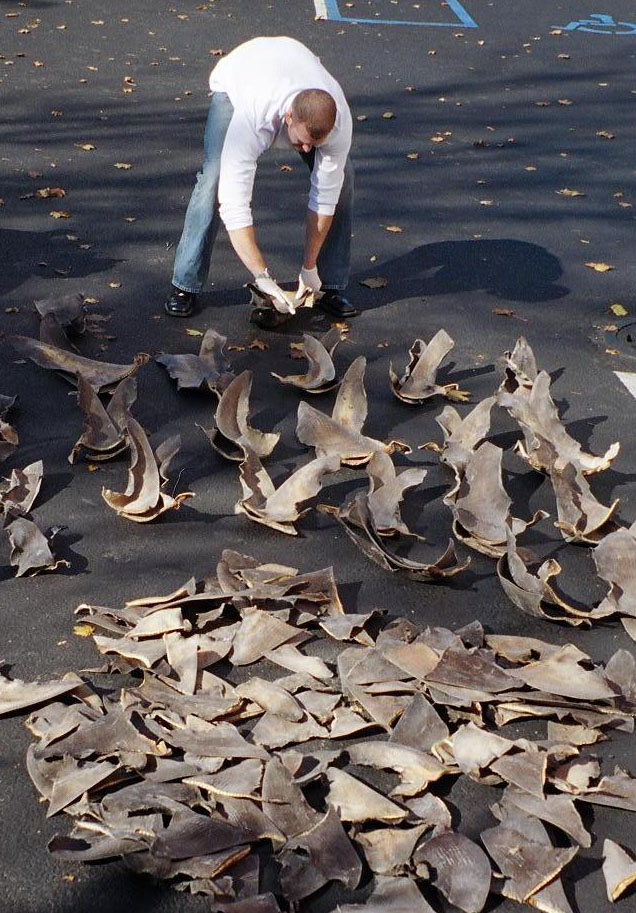
Confiscated shark fins

=== Protection of endangered species ===
Barcoding can be used in the conservation of endangered species through the prevention of illegal trading of CITES listed species. There is a large black market for fish based products and also in the aquarium and pet trades. To protect sharks from overexploitation, illegal use can be detected from barcoding shark fin soup and traditional medicines.

== Methodology ==
=== Sampling in aquatic environments ===
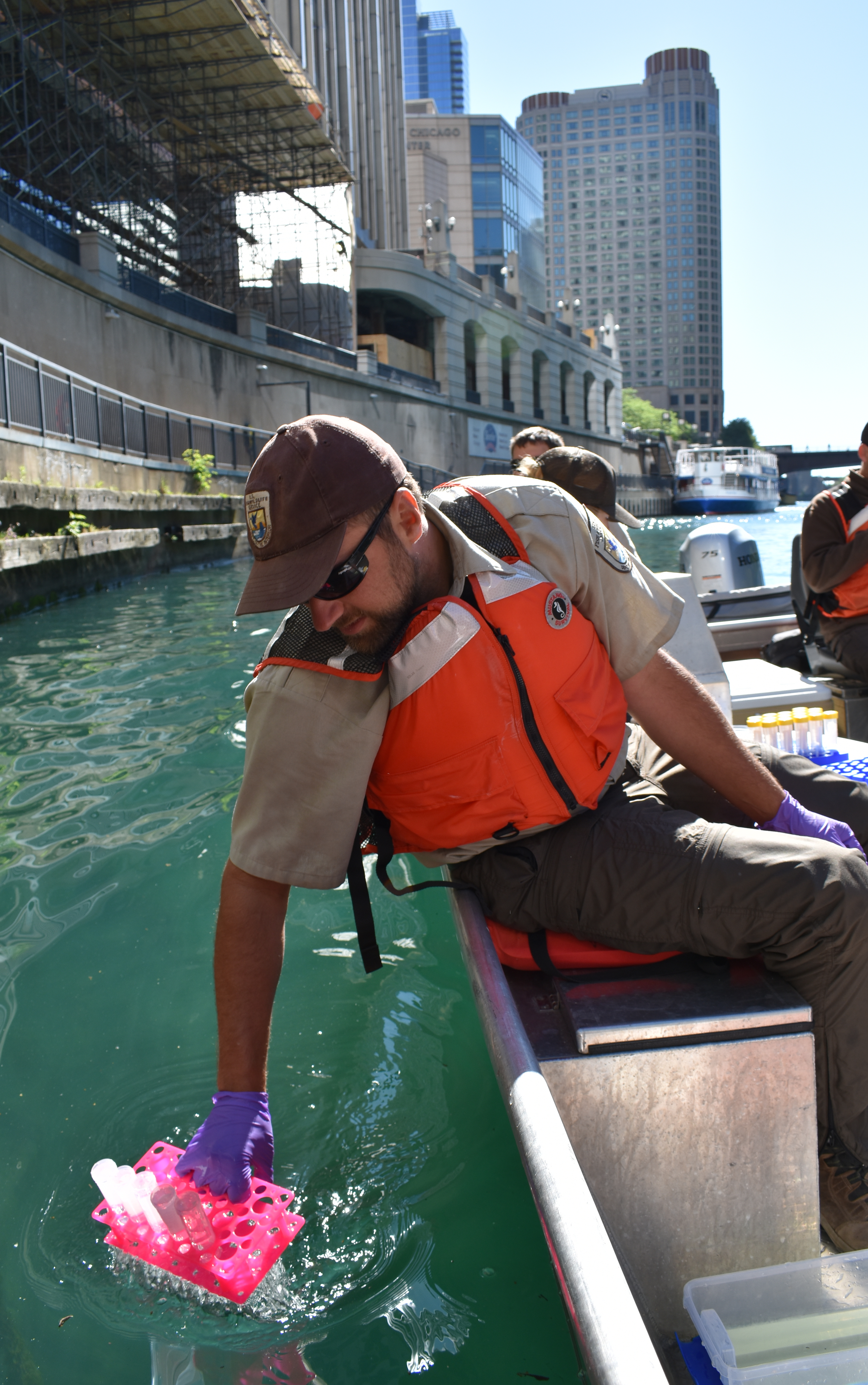
Collecting eDNA samples

Aquatic environments have special attributes that need to be considered when sampling for fish eDNA metabarcoding. Seawater sampling is of particular interest for assessment of health of marine ecosystems and their biodiversity. Although the dispersion of eDNA in seawater is large and salinity negatively influences DNA preservation, a water sample can contain high amounts of eDNA from fish up to one week after sampling. Free molecules, intestinal lining and skin cell debris are the main sources of fish eDNA.

In comparison to marine environments, ponds have biological and chemical properties that can alter eDNA detection. The small size of ponds compared to other water bodies makes them more sensitive to environmental conditions such as exposure to UV light and changes in temperature and pH. These factors can affect the amount of eDNA. Moreover, trees and dense vegetation around ponds represent a barrier that prevents water aeration by wind. Such barriers can also promote the accumulation of chemical substances that damage eDNA integrity. Heterogeneous distribution of eDNA in ponds may affect detection of fishes. Availability of fish eDNA is also dependent of life stage, activity, seasonality and behavior. The largest amounts of eDNA are obtained from spawning, larval stages and breeding activity.

=== Target regions ===
Primer design is crucial for metabarcoding success. Some studies on primer development have described cytochrome B and 16S as suitable target regions for fish metabarcoding. Evans et.al. (2016) described that Ac16S and L2513/H2714 primer sets are able to detect fish species accurately in different mesocosms. Another study performed by Valentini et.al. (2016) showed that the L1848/H1913 primer pair, which amplifies a region of 12S rRNA locus, was able to reach high taxonomical coverage and discrimination even with a short target fragment. This research also evidenced that in 89% of sampling sites, metabarcoding approach was similar or even higher than traditional methods (e.g. electrofishing and netting methods). Hänfling et.al. (2016) performed metabarcoding experiments focused on lake fish communities using 12S_F1/12S_R1 and CytB_L14841/CytB_H15149 primer pairs, whose targets were located in the mitochondrial 12S and cytochrome B regions respectively. The results demonstrate that detection of fish species was higher when using 12S primers than CytB. This was due to the persistence of shorter 12S fragments (~100 bp) in comparison to larger CytB amplicon (~460 bp). In general, these studies summarize that special considerations about primer design and selection have to be taken according to the objectives and nature of the experiment.

== Fish reference databases ==
There are a number of open access databases available to researchers worldwide. The proper identification of fish specimens with DNA barcoding methods relies heavily on the quality and species coverage of available sequence databases. A fish reference database is an electronic database that typically contains DNA barcodes, images, and geospatial coordinates of examined fish specimens. The database can also contain linkages to voucher specimens, information on species distributions, nomenclature, authoritative taxonomic information, collateral natural history information and literature citations. Reference databases may be curated, meaning that the entries are subjected to expert assessment before being included, or uncurated, in which case they may include a large number of reference sequences but with less reliable identification of species.

FISH-BOL

Launched in 2005, The Fish Barcode of Life Initiative (FISH-BOL) www.fishbol.org is an international research collaboration that is assembling a standardized reference DNA sequence library for all fish species. It is a concerted global research project with the goal to collect and assemble standardized DNA barcode sequences and associated voucher provenance data in a curated reference sequence library to aid the molecular identification of all fish species.

If researchers wish to contribute to the FISH-BOL reference library, clear guidelines are provided for specimen collection, imaging, preservation, and archival, as well as meta-data collection and submission protocols. The Fish-BOL database functions as a portal to the Barcode of Life Data Systems (BOLD).

French Polynesia Fish Barcoding Base

The French Polynesia Fish Barcoding Database contains all the specimens captured during several field trips organised or participated in by CRIOBE (Centre for Island Research and Environmental Observatory) since 2006 in the Archipelagos of French Polynesia. For each classified specimen, the following information can be available: scientific name, picture, date, GPS coordinate, depth and method of capture, size, and Cytochrome Oxidase c Subunit 1 (CO1) DNA sequence. The database can be searched using name (genus or species) or using a part of the CO1 DNA sequence.

Aquagene

A collaborative product developed by several German institutions, Aquagene provides free access to curated genetic information of marine fish species. The database allows species identification by DNA sequence comparisons. All species are characterized by multiple gene sequences, presently including the standard CO1 barcoding gene together with CYTB, MYH6 and (coming shortly) RHOD, facilitating unambiguous species determination even for closely related species or those with high intraspecific diversity. The genetic data is complemented online with additional data of the sampled specimen, such as digital images, voucher number and geographic origin.

Additional resources

Other reference databases that are more general, but may also be useful for barcoding fish are the Barcode of Life Datasystem and Genbank.

== Advantages ==
Barcoding/metabarcoding provides quick and usually reliable species identification, meaning that morphological identification, i.e. taxonomic expertise, is not needed. Metabarcoding also makes it possible to identify species when organisms are degraded or only part of an organism is available. It is a powerful tool for detection of rare and/or invasive species, which can be detected despite low abundance. Traditional methods to assess fish biodiversity, abundance and density include the use of gears like nets, electrofishing equipment, trawls, cages, fyke-nets or other gear which show reliable results of presence only for abundant species. Contrary, rare native species, as well as newly established alien species, are less likely to be detected via traditional methods, leading to incorrect absence/presence assumptions. Barcoding/metabarcoding is also in some cases a non-invasive sampling method, as it provides the opportunity to analyze DNA from eDNA or by sampling living organisms.

For fish parasites, metabarcoding allows for detection of cryptic or microscopic parasites from aquatic environments, which is difficult with more direct methods (e.g. identifying species from samples with microscopy). Some parasites exhibit cryptic variation and metabarcoding can be helpful method in revealing this.

The application of eDNA metabarcoding is cost-effective in large surveys or when many samples are required. eDNA can reduce the costs of fishing, transport of samples and time invested by taxonomists, and in most cases requires only small amounts of DNA from target species to reach reliable detection. Constantly decreasing prices for barcoding/metabarcoding due to technical development is another advantage. The eDNA approach is also suitable for monitoring of inaccessible environments.

== Challenges ==
The results obtained from metabarcoding are limited or biased to the frequency of occurrence. It is also problematic that far from all species have barcodes attached to them.

Even though metabarcoding may overcome some practical limitations of conventional sampling methods, there is still no consensus regarding experimental design and the bioinformatic criteria for application of eDNA metabarcoding. The lack of criteria is due to the heterogeneity of experiments and studies conducted so far, which dealt with different fish diversities and abundances, types of aquatic ecosystems, numbers of markers and marker specificities.

Another significant challenge for the method is how to quantify fish abundance from molecular data. Although there are some cases in which quantification has been possible there appears to be no consensus on how, or to what extent, molecular data can meet this aim for fish monitoring.

== See also ==
- DNA barcoding
- DNA barcoding in diet assessment
- Algae DNA barcoding
- Microbial DNA barcoding
- Aquatic macroinvertebrate DNA barcoding
