= Aquatic macroinvertebrate DNA barcoding =

Technique used in macroinvertebrate biology

DNA barcoding is an alternative method to the traditional morphological taxonomic classification, and has frequently been used to identify species of aquatic macroinvertebrates (generally considered those large enough to be seen without magnification). Many are crucial indicator organisms in the bioassessment of freshwater (e.g.: Ephemeroptera, Plecoptera, Trichoptera) and marine (e.g. Annelida, Echinoderms, Molluscs) ecosystems.

Since its introduction, the field of DNA barcoding has matured to bridge the gap between traditional taxonomy and molecular systematics. This technique has the ability to provide more detailed taxonomic information, particularly for cryptic, small, or rare species. DNA barcoding involves specific targeting of gene regions that are found and conserved in most animal species, but have high variation between members of different species. Accurate diagnosis depends on low intraspecific variation compared with that between species, a short DNA sequence such as Cytochrome Subunit Oxidase I gene (COI), would allow precise allocation of an individual to a taxon.

== Methodology ==
While the concept of using DNA sequence divergence for species discrimination has been reported earlier, Hebert et al. (2003) were pioneers in proposing standardization of DNA barcoding as a method of molecularly distinguishing species.

Specimens collection for DNA barcoding does not differ from the traditional methods, apart from the fact that the samples should be preserved in high concentration (>70%) ethanol. It has been indicated that the typical protocol of storing benthic samples in formalin has an adverse effect on DNA integrity.

The key concept for barcoding macroinvertebrates, is proper selection of DNA markers (DNA barcode region) to amplify appropriate gene regions, using PCR techniques. The DNA barcode region needs to be ideally conserved within a species, but variable among different (even closely related) species and therefore, its sequence should serve as a species-specific genetic tag. Therefore, the selection of the marker plays an important role. Cytochrome Subunit Oxidase I gene (COI) is one of the most widely used markers in barcoding of macroinvertebrates. Other markers that can be used are ribosomal RNA genes 16S and 18S.

Moreover, sorting invertebrates into different size categories is useful, since specimens in a sample can vary widely in biomass, depending on species and life stage.

For further details on methods see DNA barcoding.

=== DNA metabarcoding ===
Due to the significant number of taxa that compose aquatic macroinvertebrate communities, DNA metabarcoding method is generally used to assess distinct taxa within bulk or water samples. DNA metabarcoding is a method that consists of the same workflow as DNA barcoding, distinguished by the use of high-throughput sequencing (HTS) technologies. The potential of DNA metabarcoding in the assessment and monitoring of various taxonomic groups, has been successfully demonstrated in several studies. Numerous researchers have used metabarcoding methods to classify benthic macroinvertebrates from tissue samples, indicating its feasibility and higher sensitivity from classical taxonomy methods. Others, validate the use of next-generation sequencing (NGS) technologies in environmental samples to evaluate water quality in marine ecosystems and in freshwater biodiversity studies, including macroinvertebrate species assessment. Applications of these technologies in environmental samples is constantly increasing. Most of the recent studies are based on advancing eDNA approaches' implementation, field validation, platform and barcode choice or database limitations.

== Application and challenges ==
Macroinvertebrates (meta)barcoding methods are often used in:

- Biodiversity assessment. Because of the large number of macroinvertebrate species, sample processing (sorting and identification) is laborious and often difficult task that can lead to errors during the assessment.
- Environmental monitoring programs. Macroinvertebrates within the same system may be residents from several months to multiple years, depending on the lifespan of each organism. Consequently, macroinvertebrate communities inhabit aquatic ecosystems long enough to reflect the chronic effects of pollutants and yet short enough to respond to relatively acute changes in water quality. Because of the limited mobility of macroinvertebrates and their relative inability to move away from adverse conditions, the location of chronic sources of pollution often can be pinpointed by comparing communities of these organisms.
- Detection of alien species. Application of eDNA and (meta) barcoding techniques are constantly increasing in the studies of invasion processes.
- Species identification. 'Species' level identification requires a high level of taxonomic expertise. Different developmental stages of macroinvertebrates are often difficult to identify morphologically, even for experts, especially because of the lack of appropriate identification keys for aquatic macroinvertebrates . For some aquatic invertebrates taxa for example, taxonomic identification is only possible for males and some late instars, but the coupling of barcoding with traditional taxonomy provides a robust framework for biological identification. Often, species cannot be identified as they are morphologically cryptic, similar or represent less known groups. It has been suggested that a combined analysis of morphological and molecular data could provide the best solution into what is called "integrative taxonomy". Number of studies have used barcoding or metabarcoding approaches on different groups, for example Odonates, specifically dragonflies (Anisoptera) and the damselflies (Zygoptera), with recommendation to use combination of markers.
- Stress response. Individual freshwater invertebrate species, often merged to a higher taxonomic level for biomonitoring purposes, can differ substantially in their tolerance to stressors and respond in more complex ways than observed at genus level. Identifications based on DNA barcoding have the potential to improve detection of small changes in stream conditions. Recent results showed that DNA barcoding can increase taxonomic resolution and thereby, increase the sensitivity of bioassessment metrics.

There are also many challenges when it comes to genetic barcoding of aquatic macroinvertebrates:

- Reference libraries. Availability of reference libraries of DNA barcodes is very important in species' identification.
- Missing species in databases. Information about existing species are usually not complete or correlated with ecological parameters such as depth, sampling technique, salinity etc.
- Validation of data quality. Databases' records are often not curated.
- Outdated taxonomy. Species in databases can be sometimes named with outdated taxonomy (e.g. synonyms).
- Quantitative measurement of species diversity (estimation of biomass and abundance of species).
- Lacking DNA information. Species in earlier literature are identified only by taxonomic features of which no DNA samples exist to confirm.
- Technical challenges must be taken into consideration, such as the need to apply different protocols when working with different organisms, selection of an appropriate DNA barcoding markers, primer design (identification of conserved regions suitable as primer-binding sites, evaluation of the taxonomic coverage and the ability of the amplified regions to resolve taxa at the family level, etc.).
- Costs related with sequencing.

== See also ==
- DNA barcoding
- Fish DNA barcoding
- Algae DNA barcoding
- PCR
- Sequencing
