= DNA barcoding in diet assessment =

Use of DNA barcoding to analyse the diet of organisms

DNA barcoding in diet assessment is the use of DNA barcoding to analyse the diet of organisms and further detect and describe their trophic interactions. This approach is based on the identification of consumed species by characterization of DNA present in dietary samples, e.g. individual food remains, regurgitates, gut and fecal samples, homogenized body of the host organism, target of the diet study (for example with whole body of insects).

The DNA sequencing approach to be adopted depends on the diet breadth of the target consumer. For organisms feeding on one or only few species, traditional Sanger sequencing techniques can be used. For polyphagous species with diet items more difficult to identify, it is conceivable to determine all consumed species using NGS methodology.

The barcode markers utilized for amplification will differ depending on the diet of the target organism. For herbivore diets, the standard DNA barcode loci will differ significantly depending on the plant taxonomic level. Therefore, for identifying plant tissue at the taxonomic family or genus level, the markers rbcL and trn-L-intron are used, which differ from the loci ITS2, matK, trnH-psbA (noncoding intergenic spacer) used to identify diet items to genus and species level. For animal prey, the most broadly used DNA barcode markers to identify diets are the mitochondrial cytochrome C oxydase (COI) and cytochrome b (cytb). When the diet is broad and diverse, DNA metabarcoding is used to identify most of the consumed items.

== Advantages ==
A major benefit of using DNA barcoding in diet assessment is the ability to provide high taxonomic resolution of consumed species. Indeed, when compared to traditional morphological analysis, DNA barcoding enables a more reliable separation of closely related taxa reducing the observed bias. Moreover, DNA barcoding enables to detect soft and highly digested items, not recognisable through morphological identification. For example, Arachnids feed on pre-digested bodies of insects or other small animals and their stomach content is too decomposed and morphologically unrecognizable using traditional methods such as microscopy.

When investigating herbivores diet, DNA metabarcoding enables detection of highly digested plant items with a higher number of taxa identified compared to microhistology and macroscopic analysis. For instance, Nichols et al. (2016) highlighted the taxonomic precision of metabarcoding on rumen contents, with on average 90% of DNA-sequences being identified to genus or species level in comparison to 75% of plant fragments recognised with macroscopy. Moreover, another empirically tested advantage of metabarcoding compared to traditional time-consuming methods, involves higher cost efficiency. Finally, with its fine resolution, DNA barcoding represents a crucial tool in wildlife management to identify the feeding habits of endangered species and animals that can cause feeding damages to the environment.

== Challenges ==
With DNA barcoding it is not possible to retrieve information about sex or age of prey species, which can be crucial. This limitation can anyway be overcome with an additional step in the analysis by using microsatellite polymorphism and Y-chromosome amplification. Moreover, DNA provides detailed information of the most recent events (e.g. 24–48 hr) but it is not able to provide a longer dietary prospect unless a continuous sampling is conducted. Additionally, when using generic primers that amplify 'barcode' regions from a broad range of food species, the amplifiable host DNA may largely outnumber the presence of prey DNA, complicating prey detection. However, a strategy to prevent the host DNA amplification can be the addition of a predator-specific blocking primer. Indeed, blocking primers for suppressing amplification of predator DNA allows the amplification of the other vertebrate groups and produces amplicon mixes that are predominately food DNA.

Despite the improvement of diet assessment via DNA barcoding, secondary consumption (prey of the prey, parasites, etc.) still represents a confounding factor. In fact, some secondary prey may result in the analysis as primary prey items, introducing a bias. However, due to a much lower total biomass and to a higher level of degradation, DNA of secondary prey might represent only a minor part of sequences recovered compared to primary prey.

The quantitative interpretation of DNA barcoding results is not straightforward. There have been attempts to use the number of sequences recovered to estimate the abundance of prey species in diet contents (e.g. gut, faeces). For example, if the wolf ate more moose than wild boar, there should be more moose DNA in their gut, and thus, more moose sequences are recovered. Despite the evidence for general correlations between the sequence number and the biomass, actual evaluations of this method have been unsuccessful. This can be explained by the fact that tissues originally contain different densities of DNA and can be digested differently.

== Examples ==
=== Mammals ===
Mammals diet is widely studied using DNA barcoding and metabarcoding. Some differences in the methodology can be observed depending on the feeding strategy of the target mammal species, i.e. whether it is herbivore, carnivore, or omnivore.

For herbivore mammal species, DNA is usually extracted from faeces samples or rumen contents collected from road kills or animals killed during regular hunting. Within DNA barcoding, the trnL approach can be used to identify plant species by using a very short but informative fragment of chloroplast DNA (P6 loop of the chloroplast trnL (UAA) intron). Potentially, this application is applicable to all herbivorous species feeding on angiosperms and gymnosperms Alternatively to the trnL approach, the markers rbcL, ITS2, matK, trnH-psbA can be used to amplify plant species.

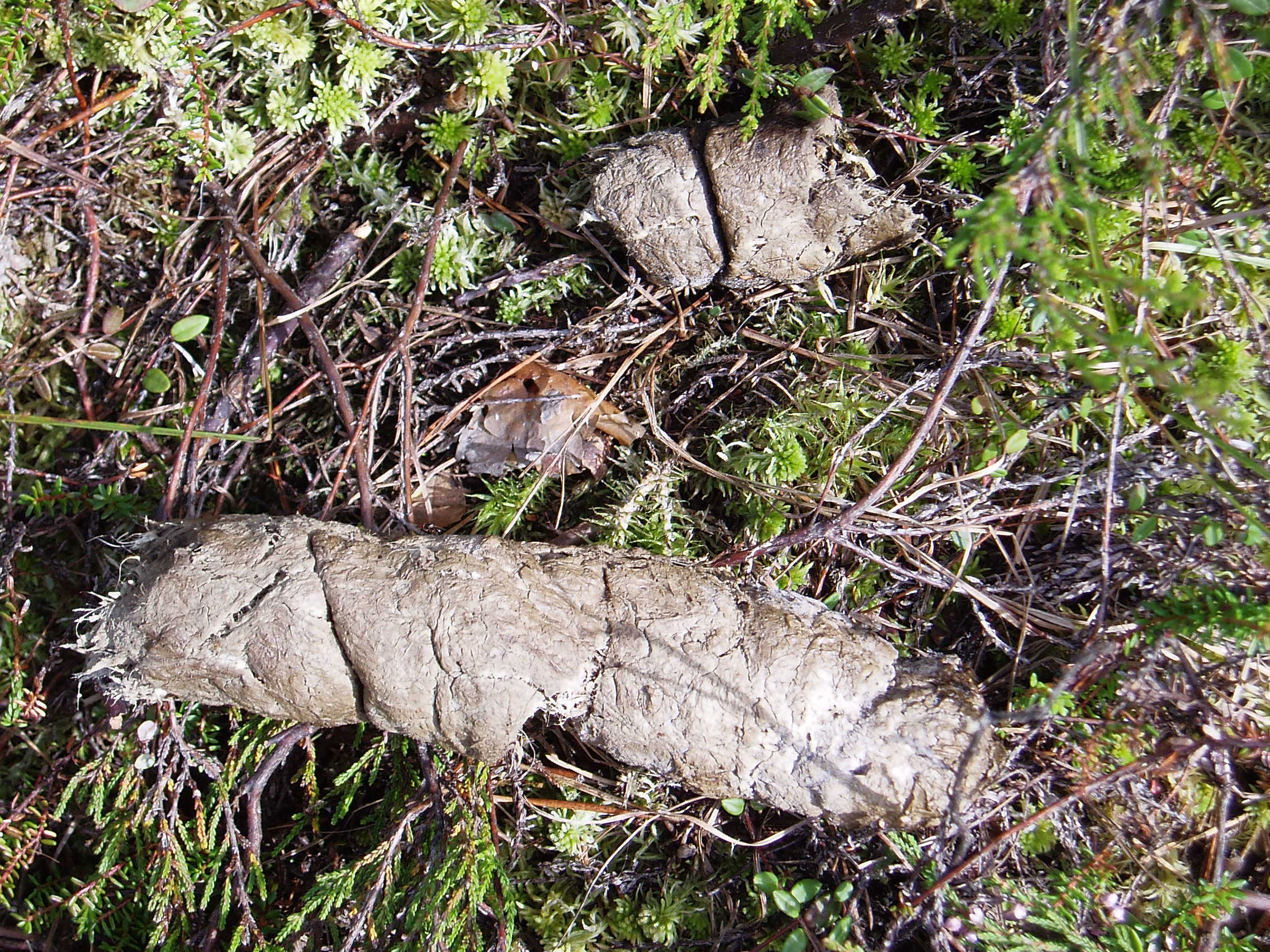
Faeces of wolf (Canis lupus) collected in Sweden

When studying small herbivores with a cryptic life style, such as voles and lemmings, DNA barcoding of ingested plants can be a crucial tool giving an accurate picture of food utilization. Additionally, the fine resolution in plant identification obtained with DNA barcoding allows researchers to understand change in diet composition over time and variability among individuals, as observed in the alpine chamois (Rupicapra rupicapra). Between October and November, by analyzing the faeces composition via DNA barcoding, the alpine chamois showed a shift in diet preferences. Also, different diet categories were observed amongst individuals within each month. For carnivores, the use of non-invasive approaches is crucial especially when dealing with elusive and endangered species. Diet assessment through DNA barcoding of faeces can have a greater efficiency in prey species detection compared to traditional diet analysis, which mostly rely upon the morphological identification of undigested hard remains in the faeces. Estimating the vertebrate diet diversity of the leopard cat (Prionailurus bengalensis) in Pakistan, Shehzad et al. (2012) identified a total of 18 prey taxa using DNA barcoding on faeces. Eight distinct bird taxa were reported, while previous studies based on conventional methods did not identify any bird species in the leopard cat diet. Another example is the use of DNA barcoding to identify soft remains of prey in the stomach contents of predators e.g. grey seals (Halichoerus grypus) and harbour porpoises (Phocoena phocoena).

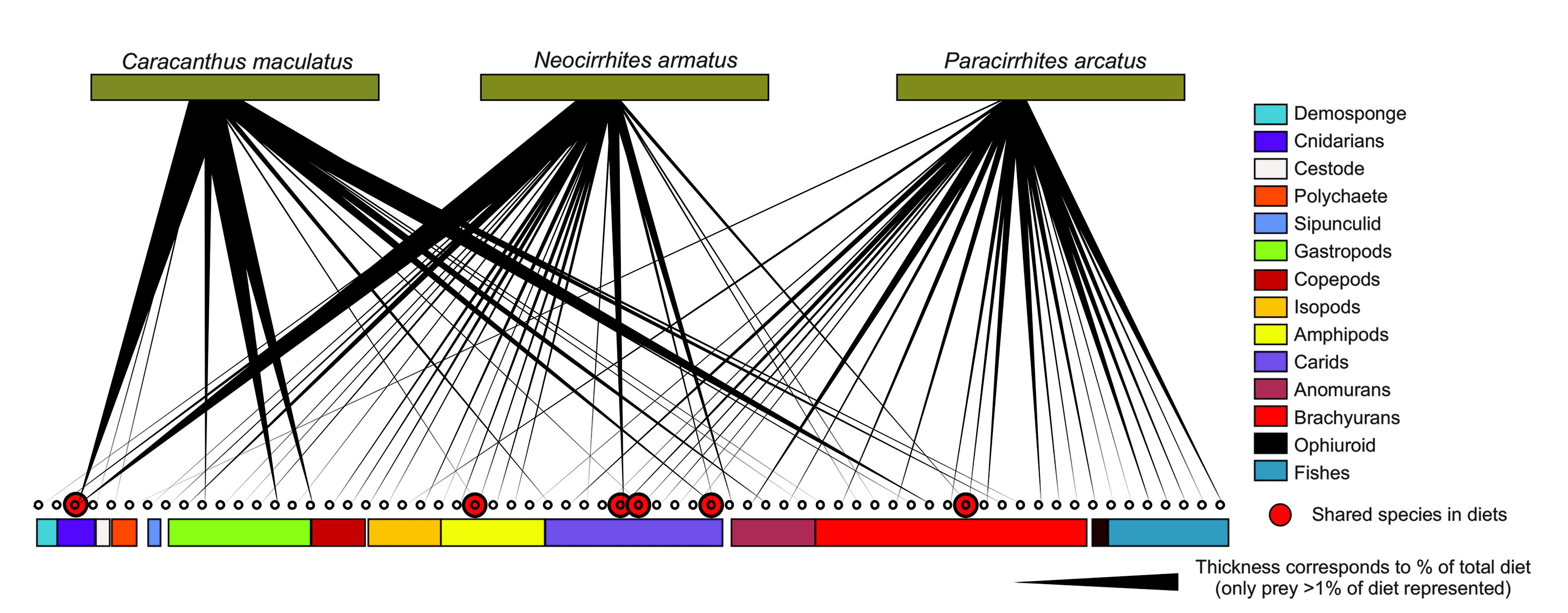
Food web reconstruction by DNA barcodes at the coral reef of Moorea, French Polynesia. Dietary partitioning among three predatory fish species as detected using metabarcoding dietary analysis. The taxonomic resolution provided by the metabarcoding approach highlights a complex interaction web and demonstrates that levels of trophic partitioning among coral reef fishes have likely been underestimated.

DNA metabarcoding is a game changer for the study of complex diets, such as for omnivores predators, feeding on many different species with both plants and animal origin. This methodology does not require knowledge about the food consumed by animals in the habitat they occupy. In a study on brown bear (Ursus arctos) diet, DNA metabarcoding allowed accurate reconstruction of a wide range of taxonomically different items present in faecal samples collected in the field.

== See also ==
- Fish DNA barcoding
- Aquatic macroinvertebrates DNA barcoding
- Microbial DNA barcoding
- Algae DNA barcoding
- Pollen DNA barcoding
