= Consortium for the Barcode of Life =

Organization for DNA barcoding as a global standard for species identification

The Consortium for the Barcode of Life (CBOL) was an international initiative dedicated to supporting the development of DNA barcoding as a global standard for species identification. CBOL's Secretariat Office is hosted by the National Museum of Natural History, Smithsonian Institution, in Washington, DC. Barcoding was proposed in 2003 by Prof. Paul Hebert of the University of Guelph in Ontario as a way of distinguishing and identifying species with a short standardized gene sequence. Hebert proposed the 658 bases of the Folmer region of the mitochondrial gene cytochrome-C oxidase-1 as the standard barcode region. Hebert is the Director of the Biodiversity Institute of Ontario, the Canadian Centre for DNA Barcoding, and the International Barcode of Life Project (iBOL), all headquartered at the University of Guelph. The Barcode of Life Data Systems (BOLD) is also located at the University of Guelph.

CBOL was created in May 2004 with support of the Alfred P. Sloan Foundation, following two meetings in 2003, also funded by the Sloan Foundation, at the Banbury Center, Cold Spring Harbor Laboratory. Since then, more than 200 organizations from more than 50 countries have joined CBOL and agreed to put their barcode data in a public database. CBOL promotes DNA barcoding through workshops, working groups, international conferences, outreach meetings to developing countries, planning meetings for barcoding projects, and production of outreach material to raise awareness of barcoding. CBOL's Database Working Group developed the data standard that GenBank, the European Bioinformatics Institute, and the DNA Data Bank of Japan have endorsed. CBOL's Plant Working Group proposed matK and rbcL as the standard barcode regions for land plants; CBOL approved this proposal in late 2005. The Fungal Working Group has identified ITS as the best barcode region for fungi, and CBOL's Protist Working Group is analyzing candidate regions for protistan groups. CBOL helped to plan and launch the global campaigns to barcode all species of fish and birds, and socioeconomically important groups like fruitflies.

One of CBOL's primary contributions to the success of barcoding was its outreach efforts to government agencies (agriculture, environment, conservation, and others) and international organizations (CITES, Convention on Biological Diversity, Food and Agriculture Organization) that could benefit from barcoding.
