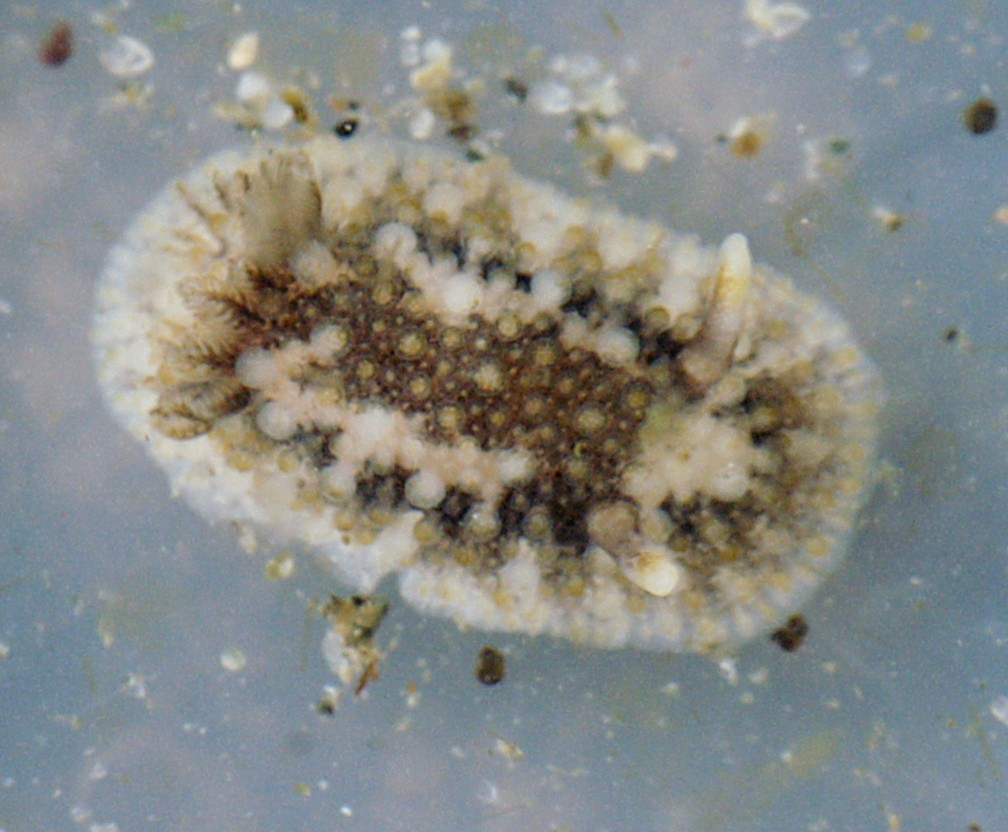
- A live individual of Onchidoris bilamellata, head end towards the right

Scientific classification
- Kingdom: Animalia
- Phylum: Mollusca
- Class: Gastropoda
- Order: Nudibranchia
- Family: Onchidorididae
- Genus: Onchidoris; Blainville, 1816

Type species
- Onchidoris leachii Blainville, 1816: synonym of Onchidoris bilamellata (Linnaeus, 1767)

Synonyms
- Atalodoris Iredale O'Donoghue, 1923; Lamellidoris Alder & Hancock, 1855; Oicodespina Gistel, 1848 (unnecessary substitute name for Villiersia d'Orbigny, 1837); Onchidorus Blainville, 1816 (incorrect original spelling); Proctaporia Mörch, 1857; Villiersia d'Orbigny, 1837

= Onchidoris =

Genus of gastropods

Onchidoris is a genus of dorid nudibranchs in the family Onchidorididae. One of its members is known to prey on barnacles and the others eat bryozoans. The radula contains a rachidian tooth when fully developed, but this is vestigial in some species.A molecular phylogeny study showed that they aren't closely related to some other species of Knoutsodonta within which genus they were formerly placed.

== Species ==
Species within the genus Onchidoris include:

- Onchidoris aureopuncta (A. E. Verrill, 1901)
- Onchidoris bilamellata (Linnaeus, 1767) - type species
- Onchidoris derjugini (Volodchenko, 1941)
- Onchidoris diademata (Gould, 1870)
- Onchidoris grisea (Gould, 1870)
- Onchidoris hystricina (Bergh, 1878)
- Onchidoris lactea (A. E. Verrill, 1900)
- Onchidoris loveni (Alder & Hancock, 1862)
- Onchidoris macropompa Martynov, Korshunova, Sanamyan & Sanamyan, 2009
- Onchidoris maugeansis (Burn, 1958)
- Onchidoris miniata (A. E. Verrill, 1901)
- Onchidoris muricata (Müller O.F., 1776)
- Onchidoris olgae (Martynov, Korshunova, Sanamyan & Sanamyan, 2009)
- Onchidoris olivacea (A. E. Verrill, 1900)
- Onchidoris perlucea Ortea & Moro, 2014
- Onchidoris proxima (Alder & Hancock, 1854)
- Onchidoris quadrimaculata (A. E. Verrill, 1900)
- Onchidoris slavi (Martynov, Korshunova, Sanamyan & Sanamyan, 2009)
- Onchidoris sparsa (Alder & Hancock, 1846)
- Onchidoris tenella (Gould, 1870)
- Onchidoris tschuktschica (Krause, 1885)

Species brought into synonymy

- Onchidoris albonigra (Pruvot-Fol, 1951): synonym of Knoutsodonta albonigra (Pruvot-Fol, 1951)
- Onchidoris aspera (Alder & Hancock, 1842): synonym of Onchidoris muricata (O. F. Müller, 1776)
- Onchidoris bouvieri (Vayssière, 1919): synonym of Knoutsodonta bouvieri (Vayssière, 1919)
- Onchidoris brasiliensis Alvim, Padula & Pimenta, 2011: synonym of Knoutsodonta brasiliensis (Alvim, Padula & Pimenta, 2011)
- Onchidoris cervinoi Ortea & Urgorri, 1979: synonym of Knoutsodonta cervinoi Ortea & Urgorri, 1979
- Onchidoris depressa (Alder & Hancock, 1842): synonym of Knoutsodonta depressa (Alder & Hancock, 1842)
- Onchidoris fusca (Müller O.F., 1776): synonym of Onchidoris bilamellata (Linnaeus, 1767)
- Onchidoris inconspicua (Alder & Hancock, 1851): synonym of Knoutsodonta inconspicua (Alder & Hancock, 1851)
- Onchidoris leachii Blainville, 1816 accepted as Onchidoris bilamellata (Linnaeus, 1767)
- Onchidoris luteocincta (M. Sars, 1870): synonym of Diaphorodoris luteocincta (M. Sars, 1870)
- Onchidoris maugeansis (Burn, 1958): synonym of Knoutsodonta maugeansis (Burn, 1958)
- Onchidoris neapolitana (delle Chiaje, 1841): synonym of Knoutsodonta neapolitana (delle Chiaje, 1841)
- Onchidoris oblonga (Alder & Hancock, 1845): synonym of Knoutsodonta oblonga (Alder & Hancock, 1845)
- Onchidoris pusilla (Alder & Hancock, 1845): synonym of Knoutsodonta pusilla (Alder & Hancock, 1845)
- Onchidoris reticulata Ortea, 1979: synonym of Knoutsodonta reticulata Ortea, 1979
- Onchidoris sparsa (Alder & Hancock, 1846): synonym of Knoutsodonta sparsa (Alder & Hancock, 1846)
- Onchidoris tridactila Ortea & Ballesteros, 1982: synonym of Knoutsodonta tridactila Ortea & Ballesteros, 1982
- Onchidoris tuberculatus Hutton, 1873: synonym of Archidoris wellingtonensis (Abraham, 1877): synonym of Doris wellingtonensis Abraham, 1877

== Taxonomy ==
Many authors prefer Onchidorus Blainville, 1816 as the valid name for the genus, changed to Onchidoris (Winckworth, 1932; Bouchet & Tardy, 1976; Thompson & Brown, 1976; Cattaneo & Barletta, 1984). According to Pruvot-Fol (1954) however this latter is a nomen nudum, while the elder synonym Villiersia is a nomen oblitum (see also Abbott, 1974). This is why Odhner (1907), Pruvot-Fol (1954), Swennen (1961) and Abbott (1974) are followed in the use of Lamellidoris Alder & Hancock, 1855.
