= Onchidoris hystricina =

Scientific classification
- Kingdom: Animalia
- Phylum: Mollusca
- Class: Gastropoda
- Order: Nudibranchia
- Family: Onchidorididae
- Genus: Onchidoris
- Species: O. hystricina

Binomial name
- Onchidoris hystricina (Bergh, 1879)

Species of gastropod

Onchidoris hystricina is a species of sea slug, a dorid nudibranch, a shell-less marine gastropod mollusc in the family Onchidorididae.

== Distribution ==
This species was described from a specimen collected by William Healey Dall in Alaska at Kyska Island, Aleutian Islands. It is considered by some authors to be a synonym of Onchidoris muricata. The name was used incorrectly for the species Diaphorodoris lirulatocauda on the Pacific coast of the US and Canada.
