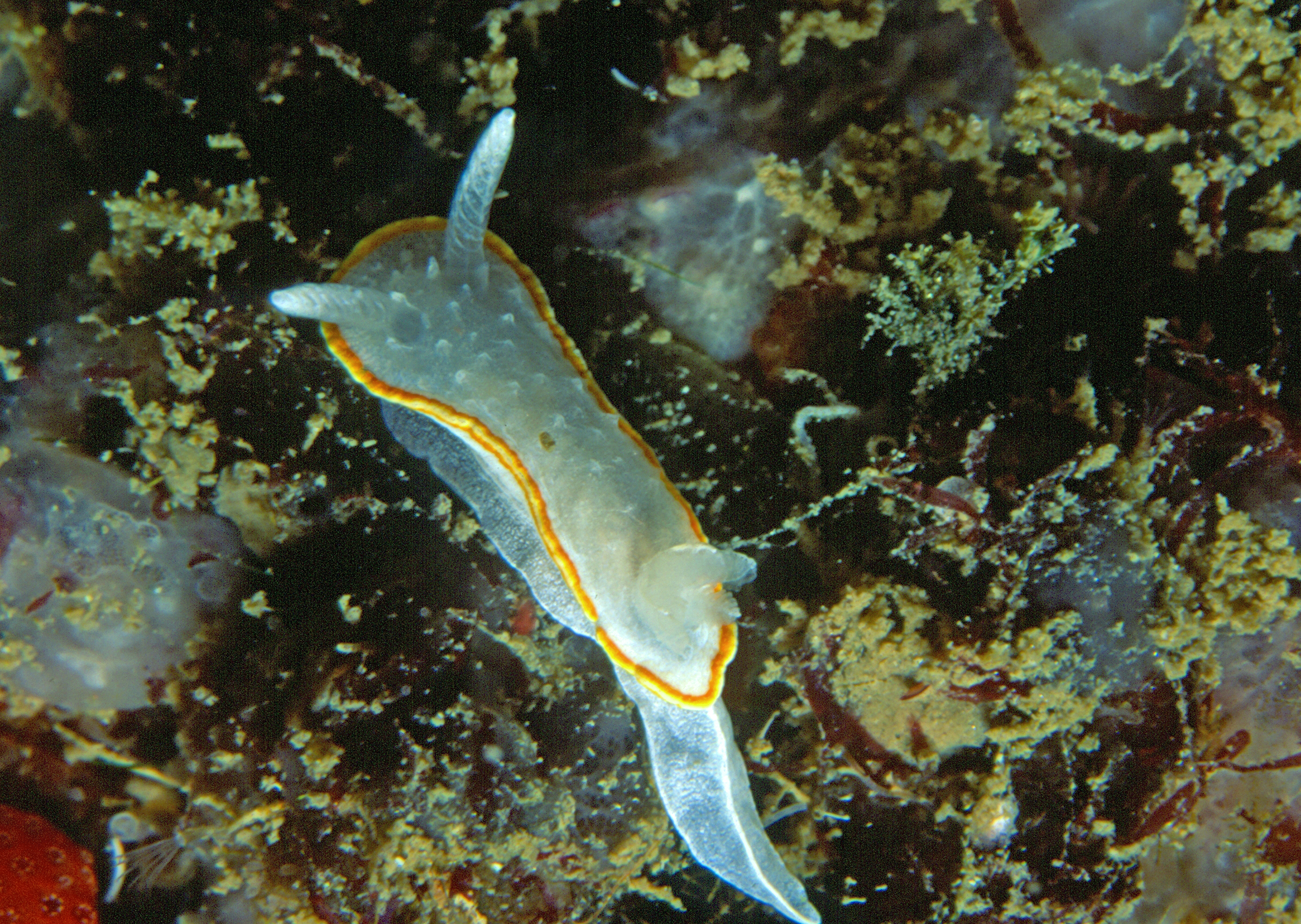
- Diaphorodoris alba, Banyuls-sur-Mer, France

Scientific classification
- Domain: Eukaryota
- Kingdom: Animalia
- Phylum: Mollusca
- Class: Gastropoda
- Order: Nudibranchia
- Superfamily: Onchidoridoidea
- Family: Calycidorididae
- Genus: Diaphorodoris
- Species: D. alba

Binomial name
- Diaphorodoris alba Portmann & Sandmeier, 1960

Synonyms
- Diaphorodoris luteocincta var. alba Portmann & Sandmeier, 1960

= Diaphorodoris alba =

Species of gastropod

Diaphorodoris alba is a species of sea slug, a dorid nudibranch, a shell-less marine gastropod mollusc in the family Calycidorididae.

== Distribution ==
This species was described from Banyuls-sur-Mer and Villefranche-sur-Mer, France and Naples, Italy. It is reported from Pembrokeshire, Wales and on coasts of the Atlantic Ocean south to the Mediterranean Sea.
