= Onchidoris derjugini =

Scientific classification
- Domain: Eukaryota
- Kingdom: Animalia
- Phylum: Mollusca
- Class: Gastropoda
- Order: Nudibranchia
- Superfamily: Onchidoridoidea
- Family: Onchidorididae
- Genus: Onchidoris
- Species: O. derjugini

Binomial name
- Onchidoris derjugini (Volodchenko, 1941)

Synonyms
- Adalaria derjugini Volodchenko, 1941

Species of gastropod

Onchidoris derjugini is a species of sea slug, a dorid nudibranch, a shell-less marine gastropod mollusc in the family Onchidorididae.

== Distribution ==
This species was described from the Japan Sea on the Pacific Ocean coast of Russia. The specific name commemorates Konstantin Deryugin.

== Description ==
Millen (1987) considers this species to be poorly described. "It can be distinguished by its undenticulated lateral teeth, larger number of marginal teeth (9 vs. 4-6) and tripinnate gills. These characteristics suggest that Adalaria derjugini is probably a species of Acanthodoris."
