= Onchidoris tschuktschica =

Scientific classification
- Domain: Eukaryota
- Kingdom: Animalia
- Phylum: Mollusca
- Class: Gastropoda
- Order: Nudibranchia
- Superfamily: Onchidoridoidea
- Family: Onchidorididae
- Genus: Onchidoris
- Species: O. tschuktschica

Binomial name
- Onchidoris tschuktschica Krause, 1885

Synonyms
- Adalaria tschuctschica Krause, 1885 (misspelling); Arctadalaria septentrionalis Roginskaya, 1971

Species of gastropod

Onchidoris tschuktschica is a species of sea slug, a dorid nudibranch, a shell-less marine gastropod mollusc in the family Onchidorididae.

== Distribution ==
This species was described from Metschigman Bay on the Chukchi Peninsula, Bering Sea, on the Pacific Ocean coast of Russia.
