= Onchidoris perlucea =

Scientific classification
- Domain: Eukaryota
- Kingdom: Animalia
- Phylum: Mollusca
- Class: Gastropoda
- Order: Nudibranchia
- Superfamily: Onchidoridoidea
- Family: Onchidorididae
- Genus: Onchidoris
- Species: O. perlucea

Binomial name
- Onchidoris perlucea Ortea & Moro, 2014

Species of gastropod

Onchidoris perlucea is a species of sea slug, a dorid nudibranch, a shell-less marine gastropod mollusc in the family Onchidorididae.

== Distribution ==
This species was described from Taliarte, Gran Canaria, Canary Islands, North Atlantic Ocean.
