= Slavi =

Slavi may refer to:

- Slavi (people), common Latin and Italian term for Slavic peoples
- Il Regno de gli Slavi (1601), a historical work of Mavro Orbini
- Neozygites slavi, a microscopic fungus
- Onchidoris slavi, a species of sea slug
- Slavi, a personal name:
  - Slavi Kostenski, a Bulgarian footballer
  - Slavi Merdzhanov, a Bulgarian revolutionary
  - Slavi Spasov, a Bulgarian footballer
  - Slavi Trifonov, a Bulgarian musician and actor
  - Slavi Zhekov, a Bulgarian footballer

== See also ==
- Slavi's Show
- Slavia (disambiguation)
- Sclavi (disambiguation)
