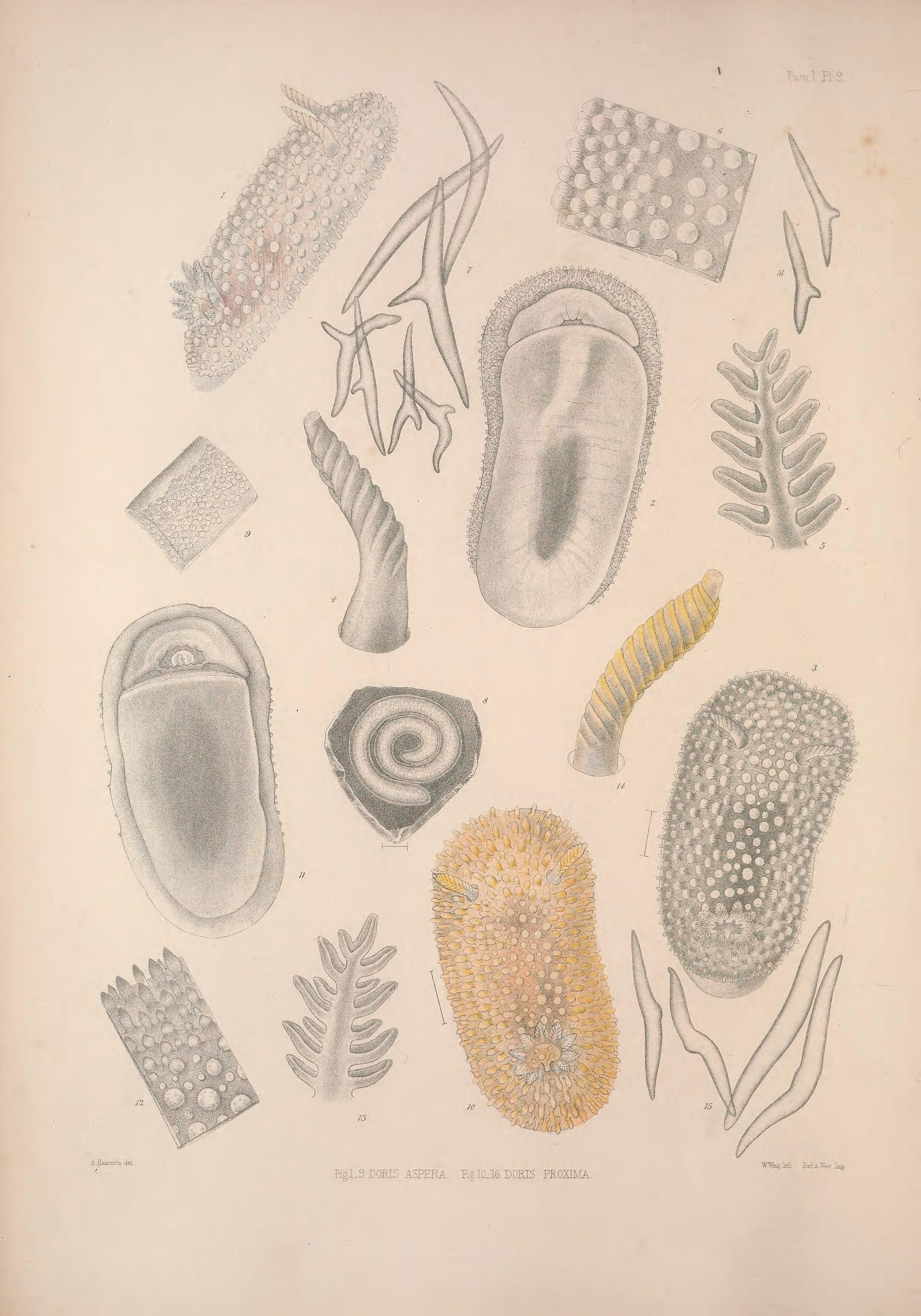
- Onchidoris proxima in the original combination Doris proxima in Alder & Hancock, 1854, fig 10-16

Scientific classification
- Kingdom: Animalia
- Phylum: Mollusca
- Class: Gastropoda
- Order: Nudibranchia
- Family: Onchidorididae
- Genus: Onchidoris
- Species: O. proxima

Binomial name
- Onchidoris proxima (Alder & Hancock, 1854)

Synonyms
- Doris proxima Alder & Hancock, 1854; Adalaria proxima (Alder & Hancock, 1854)

= Onchidoris proxima =

Species of gastropod

Onchidoris proxima is a species of sea slug, a dorid nudibranch, a shell-less marine gastropod mollusc in the family Onchidorididae. This species is found in the northeastern and northwestern parts of the Atlantic Ocean. It is also reported from the northeastern Pacific Ocean. Previously in the genus Adalaria this species was moved to Onchidoris as a result of a molecular phylogeny study.

== Distribution ==
This species was described from Birkenhead on the Irish Sea coast of England. It is native to the colder parts of the north Atlantic Ocean. Its range extends from the North Sea, the Baltic Sea and the White Sea to eastern Greenland, and the eastern coast of North America as far south as Massachusetts. Its depth range reaches as deep as 60 metres (200 ft). It is also known from the northern Pacific Ocean, from British Columbia to South Korea.

== Description ==
Onchidoris proxima is oval in shape and grows to a length of about 25 mm (1 in). The head has a flattened piece of tissue above the mouth. The mantle is covered with club-shaped tubercles with pointed ends which are stiffened with calcareous spicules (spine-like structures). The body is a yellowish-orange colour, but is often quite a pale shade, especially in the northernmost part of the animal's range. The blunt-ended rhinophores (sensory tentacles on the head) are often darker in colour than the rest of the animal, and each bears up to nineteen thin plates. The anal papilla is surrounded by a ring of about twelve feathery gills. This species can be confused with Onchidoris muricata, but that species is usually smaller and paler and has dorsal tubercles that have tips which are flattened.

== Ecology ==
Minimum recorded depth is 0 m. Maximum recorded depth is 60 m.

Onchidoris proxima feeds on the colonial bryozoan Electra pilosa, which is often found encrusted on the fronds of large brown algae such as Laminaria and Fucus serratus. It also feeds on other species of bryozoa such as Membranipora membranacea, Alcyonidium polyoum and Flustrellidra hispida if Electra is not available.

Breeding takes place in late winter and spring, when the eggs are laid in coils. The eggs are fairly large, and hatch after about forty days. The larvae have a yolksac and do not feed but drift as part of the plankton before settling in suitable habitat.

== See also ==
- Doridacea
- Gastropoda
- Mollusca
