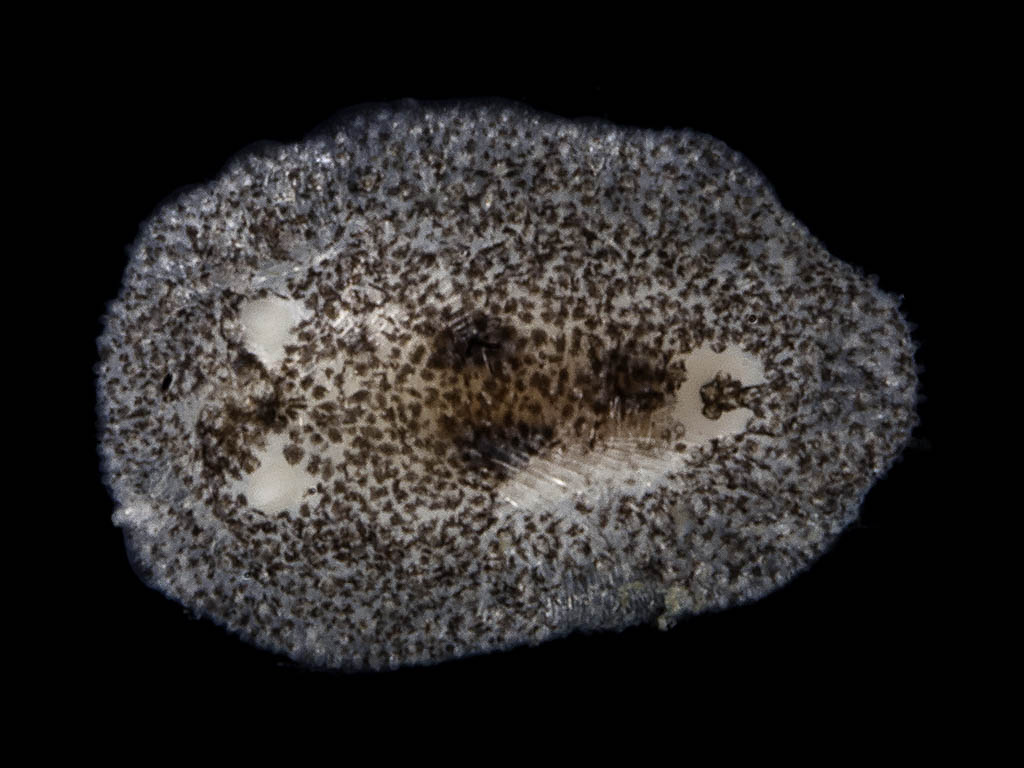
- The nudibranch Atalodoris pusilla, 5 mm length, Gulen Dive Resort, Norway.

Scientific classification
- Kingdom: Animalia
- Phylum: Mollusca
- Class: Gastropoda
- Order: Nudibranchia
- Family: Onchidorididae
- Genus: Atalodoris
- Species: A. pusilla

Binomial name
- Atalodoris pusilla (Alder & Hancock, 1845)

Synonyms
- Atalodoris albonigra (Pruvot-Fol, 1951) junior subjective synonym; Doris pusilla Alder & Hancock, 1845; Knoutsodonta albonigra (Pruvot-Fol, 1951) superseded combination; Knoutsodonta pusilla (Alder & Hancock, 1845); Lamellidoris albonigra Pruvot-Fol, 1951 (original combination); Onchidoris albonigra (Pruvot-Fol, 1951); Onchidoris pusilla (Alder & Hancock, 1845)

= Atalodoris pusilla =

Species of gastropod

Atalodoris pusilla is a species of sea slug, a dorid nudibranch, a shell-less marine gastropod mollusc in the family Onchidorididae.

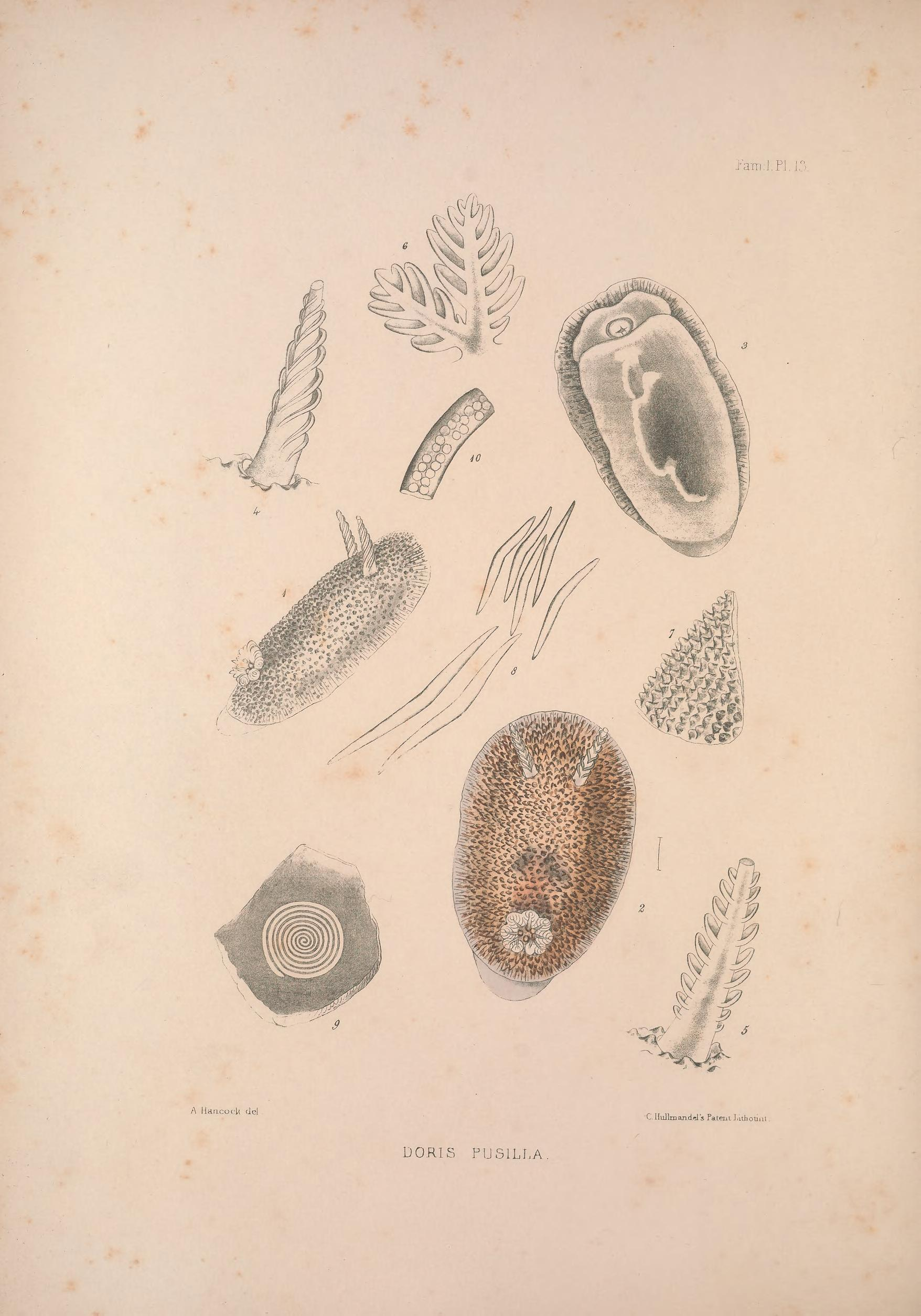
Colour plate from Alder & Hancock Monograph, 1845–55.

== Description ==
(Original description) The body is ovate and notably depressed. The cloak is a yellowish-white, thickly freckled with dark brown spots, and is covered with numerous conical papillae that are obtusely pointed at the top.

The tentacles are long, slender, pure white, and finely laminated. The branchial plumes, nine in number, are a beautiful white and are simply pinnate. They are arranged in an incomplete, somewhat distant circle around the vent and are retractile within separate cavities.

The head has a broad veil, and the foot is rather broad.

== Distribution ==
This species was described from Tor Bay, Devon, England. It is currently known from the European coasts of the North Atlantic Ocean from Norway, south to the Atlantic coast of Spain.

This species was also described from Banyuls-sur-Mer on the Mediterranean Sea coast of France. It has been reported from the Bay of Naples, Italy and the Catalan coast of Spain at Cadaqués and some other location in the Costa Brava.

== Diet ==
Atalodoris pusilla feeds on the bryozoans Escharella immersa, Microporella ciliata, Escharoides coccineus and Porella concinna.

== See also ==
- Knoutsodonta
- Onchidoris
