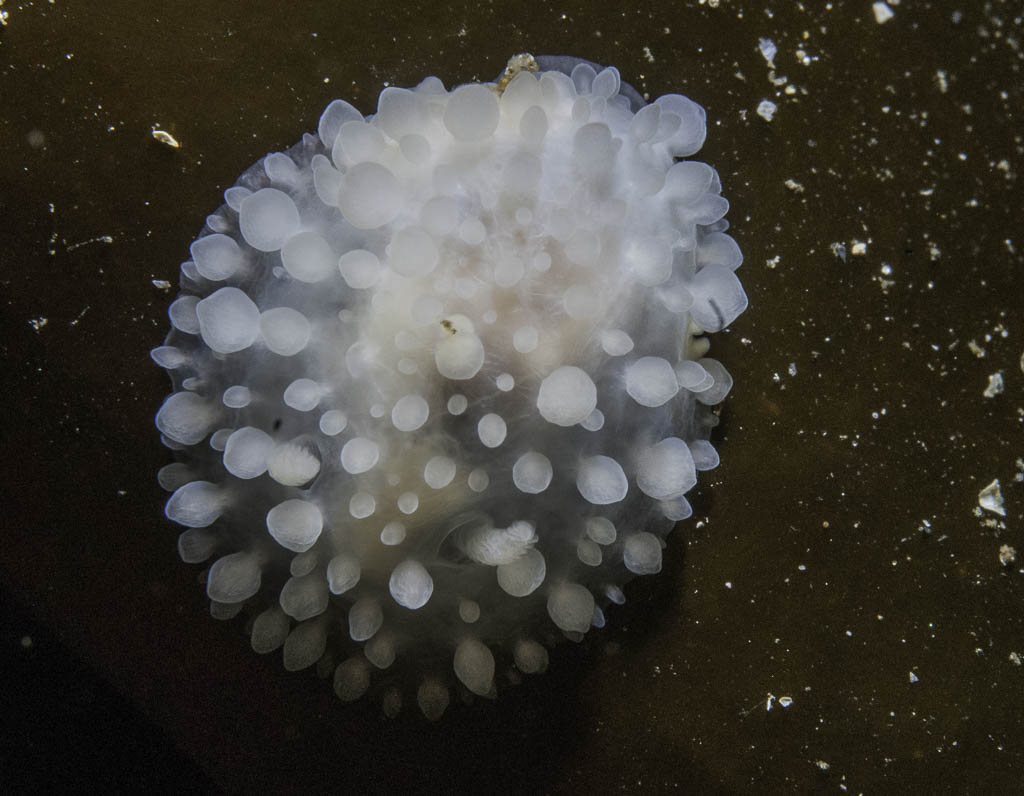
- The nudibranch Onchidoris loveni, Gulen Dive Resort, Norway.

Scientific classification
- Kingdom: Animalia
- Phylum: Mollusca
- Class: Gastropoda
- Order: Nudibranchia
- Family: Onchidorididae
- Genus: Onchidoris
- Species: O. loveni

Binomial name
- Onchidoris loveni (Alder & Hancock, 1862)

Synonyms
- Doris loveni Alder & Hancock, 1862; Adalaria loveni (Alder & Hancock, 1862)

= Onchidoris loveni =

Species of gastropod

Onchidoris loveni is a species of sea slug, a dorid nudibranch, a shell-less marine gastropod mollusc in the family Onchidorididae. This species is found in the north-eastern parts of the Atlantic Ocean.

== Distribution ==
This species was described from Bantry Bay, County Cork, Ireland. It is currently known from Sweden and Norway.
