= Onchidoris diademata =

Scientific classification
- Kingdom: Animalia
- Phylum: Mollusca
- Class: Gastropoda
- Order: Nudibranchia
- Family: Onchidorididae
- Genus: Onchidoris
- Species: O. diademata

Binomial name
- Onchidoris diademata (Gould, 1870)

Species of gastropod

Onchidoris diademata is a species of sea slug, a dorid nudibranch, a shell-less marine gastropod mollusc in the family Onchidorididae.

== Distribution ==
This species was described from Massachusetts on the Atlantic Ocean coast of the United States.
