= Idaliadoris cervinoi =

Scientific classification
- Kingdom: Animalia
- Phylum: Mollusca
- Class: Gastropoda
- Order: Nudibranchia
- Superfamily: Onchidoridoidea
- Family: Onchidorididae
- Genus: Idaliadoris
- Species: I. cervinoi

Binomial name
- Idaliadoris cervinoi (Ortea & Urgorri, 1979)

Synonyms
- Atalodoris cervinoi (Ortea & Urgorri, 1979) superseded combination; Knoutsodonta cervinoi (Ortea & Urgorri, 1979) superseded combination; Onchidoris cervinoi Ortea & Urgorri, 1979 superseded combination

Species of gastropod

Idaliadoris cervinoi is a species of sea slug, a dorid nudibranch, a shell-less marine gastropod mollusc in the family Onchidorididae.

== Distribution ==
This species was described from Galicia, on the Atlantic Ocean coast of Spain.
