= Sclavi =

Sclavi or Sclavis may refer to:

- Sclavi (people), common Latin term for Slavic peoples
- "sclavi" is a plural form of "sclavus", a Latin word for slave
- Ezio Sclavi, an Italian footballer
- Joel Sclavi, an Argentine rugby union player
- Tiziano Sclavi, an Italian comic book author
- Louis Sclavis, a French jazz musician

== See also ==
- Sclavia (disambiguation)
- Sclavonia (disambiguation)
- Slavonia (disambiguation)
- Slavia (disambiguation)
- Slavi (disambiguation)
