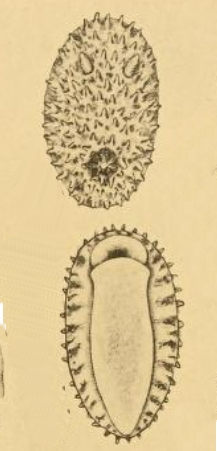
- Idaliadoris bouvieri (holotype)

Scientific classification
- Kingdom: Animalia
- Phylum: Mollusca
- Class: Gastropoda
- Order: Nudibranchia
- Family: Onchidorididae
- Genus: Idaliadoris
- Species: I. bouvieri

Binomial name
- Idaliadoris bouvieri (Vayssière, 1919)

Synonyms
- Atalodoris bouvieri (Vayssière, 1919) superseded combination; Knoutsodonta bouvieri (Vayssière, 1919) superseded combination; Lamellidoris bouvieri Vayssière, 1919 ([basionym]); Onchidoris bouvieri (Vayssière, 1919)

= Idaliadoris bouvieri =

Species of gastropod

Idaliadoris bouvieri is a species of sea slug, a dorid nudibranch, a shell-less marine gastropod mollusc in the family Onchidorididae.

== Description ==
The length of the body varies between 3 mm and 4 mm, its diameter between 1.8 mm and 2.3 mm, its height 1 mm.

(Original description in French) The body is relatively depressed and elliptical, with a very large mantle that broadly covers it. Numerous conical papillae, which are quite strong, are irregularly distributed over the entire dorsal surface of the mantle. The gill is composed of 7 well-defined, oval, pinnate leaflets.

The buccal veil is quite extensive, rounded, and lacks lateral extensions. The foot has an area half the size of the mantle; it is oblong with a slightly rounded, truncated anterior edge.

The general coloration is a pale, translucent flesh-pink. Numerous rust-brown spots are spread across the mantle, which may be more pronounced along three longitudinal bands: one median and two lateral. The rhinophores and the gill are a yellowish pink.

The radula has 34 rows with a formula of 1,1,0,1,1. The intermediate tooth is lamellar with a broad, quadrangular base and a hooked cusp whose outer edge is equipped with about a dozen denticles. The lateral or marginal tooth is also lamellar and almost square, slightly curled inward on its inner face, with a very rudimentary cusp.

== Distribution ==
This species was described from Carry-le-Rouet on the Mediterranean Sea coast of France. It is similar to Onchidoris depressa and has not been reported since the original description.
