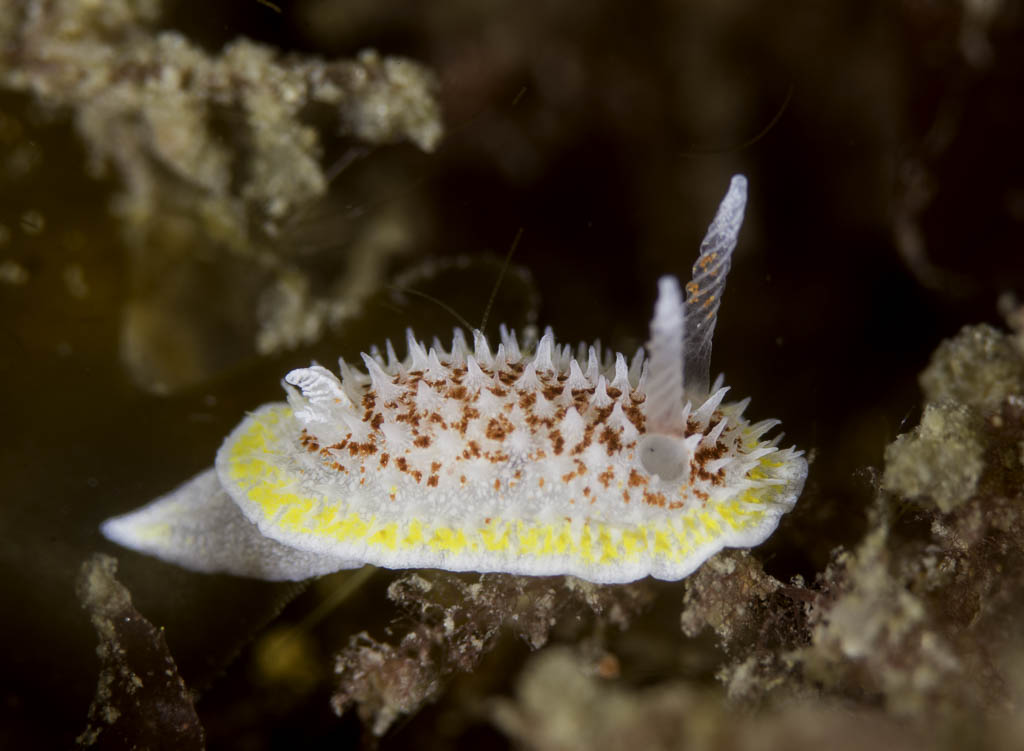
- The nudibranch Diaphorodoris luteocincta, Isle of Man, Irish Sea.

Scientific classification
- Domain: Eukaryota
- Kingdom: Animalia
- Phylum: Mollusca
- Class: Gastropoda
- Order: Nudibranchia
- Superfamily: Onchidoridoidea
- Family: Calycidorididae
- Genus: Diaphorodoris
- Species: D. luteocincta

Binomial name
- Diaphorodoris luteocincta (M. Sars, 1870)

Synonyms
- Doris beaumonti Farran, 1903; Doris luteocincta M. Sars, 1870; Onchidoris luteocincta (M. Sars, 1870)

= Diaphorodoris luteocincta =

Species of gastropod

Diaphorodoris luteocincta is a species of sea slug, a dorid nudibranch, a shell-less marine gastropod mollusc in the family Calycidorididae.

== Distribution ==
This species was described from Vallø (Tønsberg), Norway. It is reported from Norway south along the Atlantic Ocean coasts of Europe to the Mediterranean Sea.

== Description ==
The maximum recorded body length is 8 mm.
