= Onchidoris miniata =

Scientific classification
- Kingdom: Animalia
- Phylum: Mollusca
- Class: Gastropoda
- Order: Nudibranchia
- Family: Onchidorididae
- Genus: Onchidoris
- Species: O. miniata

Binomial name
- Onchidoris miniata (A. E. Verrill, 1901)

Species of gastropod

Onchidoris miniata is a species of sea slug, a dorid nudibranch, a shell-less marine gastropod mollusc in the family Onchidorididae.

== Distribution ==
This species was described from Castle Harbour, Bermuda.
