= Idaliadoris =

Scientific classification
- Kingdom: Animalia
- Phylum: Mollusca
- Class: Gastropoda
- Order: Nudibranchia
- Infraorder: Doridoidei
- Superfamily: Onchidoridoidea
- Family: Onchidorididae
- Genus: Idaliadoris; Furfaro & Trainito, 2022

Type species
- Idalia neapolitana Delle Chiaje, 1841

Genus of gastropods

Idaliadoris is a genus of dorid nudibranchs in the family Onchidorididae.

== Species ==
- Idaliadoris bouvieri (Vayssière, 1919)
- Idaliadoris brasiliensis (Alvim, Padula & Pimenta, 2011)
- Idaliadoris cervinoi (Ortea & Urgorri, 1979)
- Idaliadoris depressa (Alder & Hancock, 1842)
- Idaliadoris maugeansis (Burn, 1958)
- Idaliadoris neapolitana (Delle Chiaje, 1841)
- Idaliadoris perlucea (Ortea & Moro, 2014)
- Idaliadoris tridactila (Ortea & Ballesteros, 1982)
