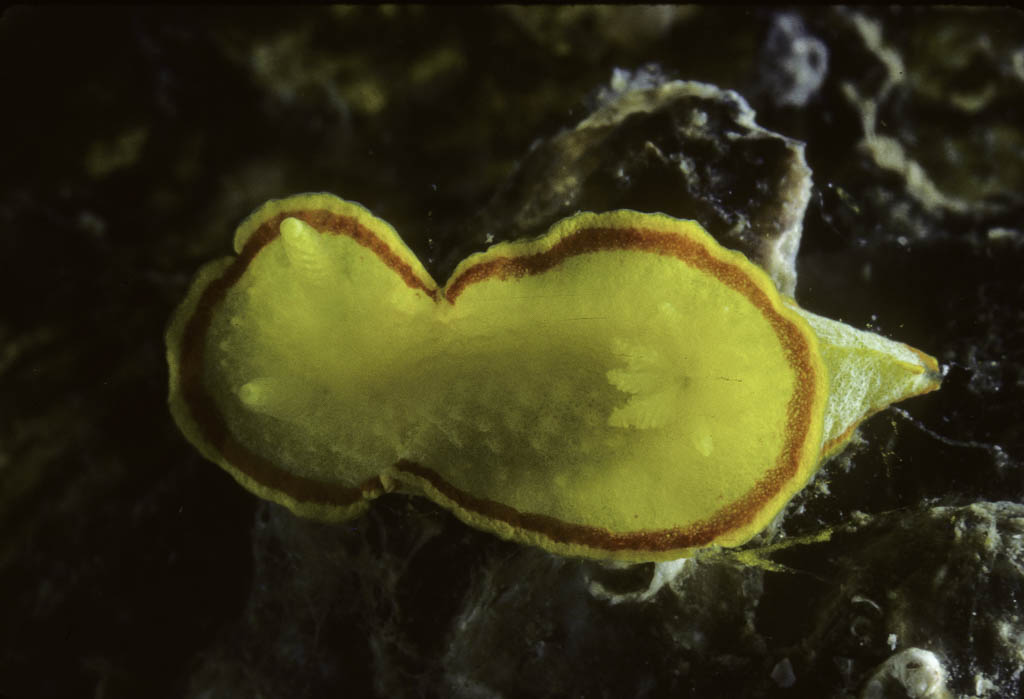
- The nudibranch Diaphorodoris mitsuii, Ping Chau, Mirs Bay, Hong Kong.

Scientific classification
- Kingdom: Animalia
- Phylum: Mollusca
- Class: Gastropoda
- Order: Nudibranchia
- Family: Calycidorididae
- Genus: Diaphorodoris
- Species: D. mitsuii

Binomial name
- Diaphorodoris mitsuii (Baba, 1938)

Synonyms
- Lamellidoris mitsuii Baba, 1938

= Diaphorodoris mitsuii =

Species of gastropod

Diaphorodoris mitsuii is a species of sea slug, a dorid nudibranch, a shell-less marine gastropod mollusc in the family Calycidorididae.

== Distribution ==
This species was described from Susaki, Izu Peninsula, Japan. It is reported from South Korea, Japan and Hong Kong. Specimens from Australia, Indonesia and the Red Sea are likely to be distinct, unnamed, species of Diaphorodoris.

== Description ==
"Length of animal about 5 mm. Body elongate-elliptical, bluntly rounded at both ends. Back covered sparsely with small conical tubercles. Oral tentacles broad lobiform, with a slit-like mouth between them. Rhinophore-sheath with smooth margin. Branchial plumes 6, small, simply pinnate, completely retractile within a cavity with smooth margin. Foot produced behind in a fairly long tail, the anterior end abruptly rounded and simply labiate. Integument with spicules. General body-colour yellow, margin of mantle with orange-yellow line fading out to yellow to the edge."
