= Calycidoris guentheri =

Scientific classification
- Kingdom: Animalia
- Phylum: Mollusca
- Class: Gastropoda
- Order: Nudibranchia
- Family: Calycidorididae
- Genus: Calycidoris
- Species: C. guentheri

Binomial name
- Calycidoris guentheri Abraham, 1876

Synonyms
- Doris sibirica Aurivillius, 1887

Species of gastropod

Calycidoris guentheri is a species of sea slug, a dorid nudibranch, a shell-less marine gastropod mollusc in the family Calycidorididae.

== Distribution ==
This species is confined to the Bering Sea.
