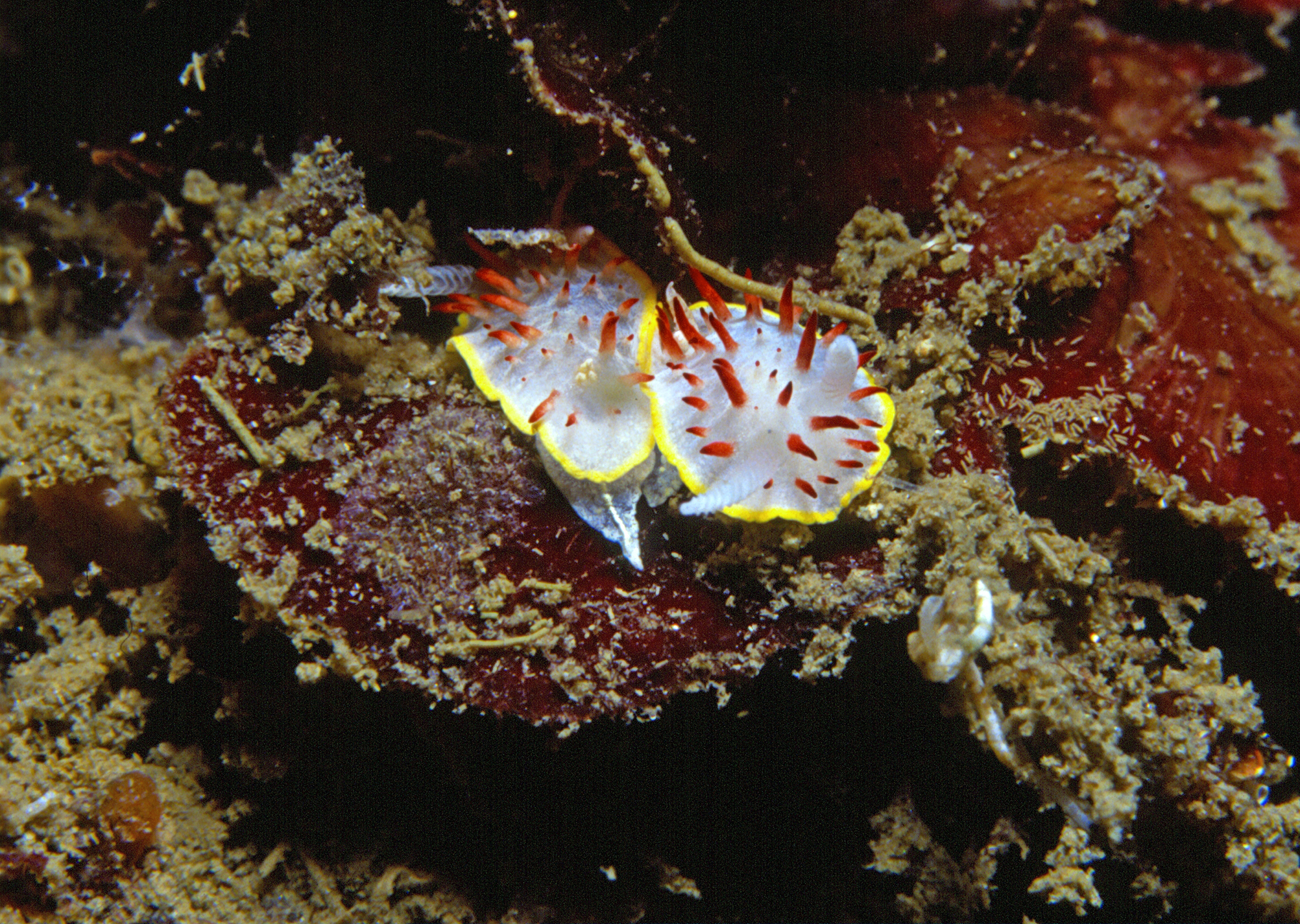
- A mating pair of Diaphorodoris papillata, Banyuls-sur-Mer.

Scientific classification
- Domain: Eukaryota
- Kingdom: Animalia
- Phylum: Mollusca
- Class: Gastropoda
- Order: Nudibranchia
- Superfamily: Onchidoridoidea
- Family: Calycidorididae
- Genus: Diaphorodoris
- Species: D. papillata

Binomial name
- Diaphorodoris papillata Portmann & Sandmeier, 1960

= Diaphorodoris papillata =

Species of gastropod

Diaphorodoris papillata is a species of sea slug, a dorid nudibranch, a shell-less marine gastropod mollusc in the family Calycidorididae.

== Distribution ==
This species was described from Naples, Italy; Villefranche-sur-Mer and Banyuls-sur-Mer, France. It is reported from the Strait of Gibraltar to Israel. It was reported from Canary Islands in 2016.

== Description ==
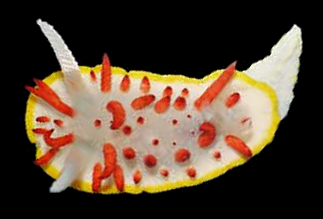
Dorsal view of Diaphorodoris papillata.

The maximum recorded body length is 10 mm.
