= Onchidoris grisea =

Scientific classification
- Kingdom: Animalia
- Phylum: Mollusca
- Class: Gastropoda
- Order: Nudibranchia
- Family: Onchidorididae
- Genus: Onchidoris
- Species: O. grisea

Binomial name
- Onchidoris grisea (Gould, 1870)

Species of gastropod

Onchidoris grisea is a species of sea slug, a dorid nudibranch, a shell-less marine gastropod mollusc in the family Onchidorididae.

== Distribution ==
This species was described from Charles River, Chelsea Beach and East Boston Point in Massachusetts on the Atlantic Ocean coast of the United States.
