= Onchidoris macropompa =

Scientific classification
- Kingdom: Animalia
- Phylum: Mollusca
- Class: Gastropoda
- Order: Nudibranchia
- Family: Onchidorididae
- Genus: Onchidoris
- Species: O. macropompa

Binomial name
- Onchidoris macropompa Martynov, Korshunova, Sanamyan & Sanamyan, 2009

Species of gastropod

Onchidoris macropompa is a species of sea slug, a dorid nudibranch, a shell-less marine gastropod mollusc in the family Onchidorididae.

== Distribution ==
This species was described from Starichkov Island, Kamchatka Peninsula on the Pacific Ocean coast of Russia. Additional specimens from Medny Island were included in the original description.
