= Onchidoris olivacea =

Scientific classification
- Kingdom: Animalia
- Phylum: Mollusca
- Class: Gastropoda
- Order: Nudibranchia
- Family: Onchidorididae
- Genus: Onchidoris
- Species: O. olivacea

Binomial name
- Onchidoris olivacea (A. E. Verrill, 1900)

Synonyms
- Doris olivacea A. E. Verrill, 1900; Lamellidoris olivacea (A. E. Verrill, 1900)

Species of gastropod

Onchidoris olivacea is a species of sea slug, a dorid nudibranch, a shell-less marine gastropod mollusc in the family Onchidorididae.

== Distribution ==
This species was described from Bailey's Bay, Bermuda. An additional specimen was described in 1901.
