= Idaliadoris maugeansis =

Scientific classification
- Kingdom: Animalia
- Phylum: Mollusca
- Class: Gastropoda
- Order: Nudibranchia
- Family: Onchidorididae
- Genus: Idaliadoris
- Species: I. maugeansis

Binomial name
- Idaliadoris maugeansis (Burn, 1958)

Synonyms
- Atalodoris maugeansis (Burn, 1958) superseded combination; Knoutsodonta maugeansis (Burn, 1958) superseded combination; Lamellidoris maugeansis Burn, 1958; Onchidoris maugeansis (Burn, 1958)

Species of gastropod

Idaliadoris maugeansis is a species of sea slug, a dorid nudibranch, a shell-less marine gastropod mollusc in the family Onchidorididae.

== Distribution ==
This species was described from Australia. It is found in Victoria and Tasmania.

== Diet ==
Idaliadoris maugeansis feeds on the encrusting bryozoan, Beania magellanica.
