= Onchidoris quadrimaculata =

Scientific classification
- Kingdom: Animalia
- Phylum: Mollusca
- Class: Gastropoda
- Order: Nudibranchia
- Family: Onchidorididae
- Genus: Onchidoris
- Species: O. quadrimaculata

Binomial name
- Onchidoris quadrimaculata (A. E. Verrill, 1900)

Synonyms
- Lamellidoris quadrimaculata A. E. Verrill, 1900

Species of gastropod

Onchidoris quadrimaculata is a species of sea slug, a dorid nudibranch, a shell-less marine gastropod mollusc in the family Onchidorididae.

== Distribution ==
This species was described from Castle Harbor, Bermuda.
