= Calycidoris =

Scientific classification
- Domain: Eukaryota
- Kingdom: Animalia
- Phylum: Mollusca
- Class: Gastropoda
- Order: Nudibranchia
- Superfamily: Onchidoridoidea
- Family: Calycidorididae
- Genus: Calycidoris; Abraham, 1876

Diversity
- 1 species

Genus of gastropods

Calycidoris is a genus of sea slugs, dorid nudibranchs, shell-less marine gastropod molluscs in the family Calycidorididae.

== Species ==
Species within this genus include:

- Calycidoris guentheri Abraham, 1876
