= Onchidoris lactea =

Scientific classification
- Kingdom: Animalia
- Phylum: Mollusca
- Class: Gastropoda
- Order: Nudibranchia
- Family: Onchidorididae
- Genus: Onchidoris
- Species: O. lactea

Binomial name
- Onchidoris lactea (A. E. Verrill, 1900)

Synonyms
- Lamellidoris lactea A. E. Verrill, 1900

Species of gastropod

Onchidoris lactea is a species of sea slug, a dorid nudibranch, a shell-less marine gastropod mollusc in the family Onchidorididae.

== Distribution ==
This species was described from Bay Island, Bailey's Bay, Bermuda. Additional specimens were described in 1901.
