= Onchidoris olgae =

Scientific classification
- Kingdom: Animalia
- Phylum: Mollusca
- Class: Gastropoda
- Order: Nudibranchia
- Family: Onchidorididae
- Genus: Onchidoris
- Species: O. olgae

Binomial name
- Onchidoris olgae (Martynov, Korshunova, Sanamyan & Sanamyan, 2009)

Synonyms
- Adalaria olgae Martynov, Korshunova, Sanamyan & Sanamyan, 2009

Species of gastropod

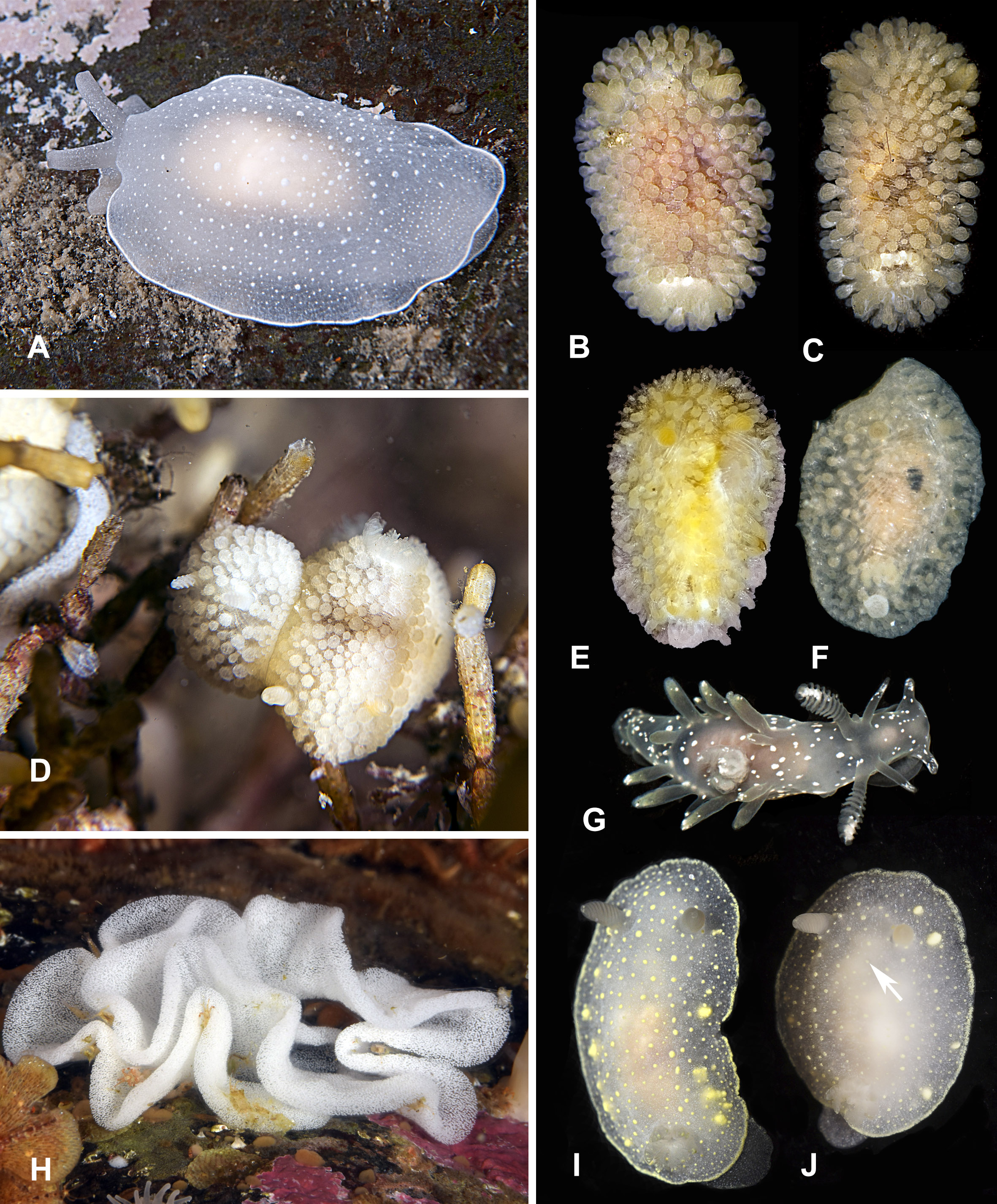
Onchidoris olgae

Onchidoris olgae is a species of sea slug, a dorid nudibranch, a shell-less marine gastropod mollusc in the family Onchidorididae.

== Distribution ==
This species was described from Starichkov Island, Kamchatka Peninsula on the Pacific Ocean coast of Russia.
