= Acanthomira uchidai =

Scientific classification
- Kingdom: Animalia
- Phylum: Mollusca
- Class: Gastropoda
- Order: Nudibranchia
- Family: Onchidorididae
- Genus: Acanthomira
- Species: A. uchidai

Binomial name
- Acanthomira uchidai (Baba, 1935)

Synonyms
- Acanthodoris uchidai Baba, 1935 superseded combination

Species of gastropod

Acanthomira uchidai is a species of sea slug, a dorid nudibranch, a shell-less marine gastropod mollusc in the family Onchidorididae.

== Distribution ==
This species was described from Daikoku-shima, Akkeshi Bay, Japan.
