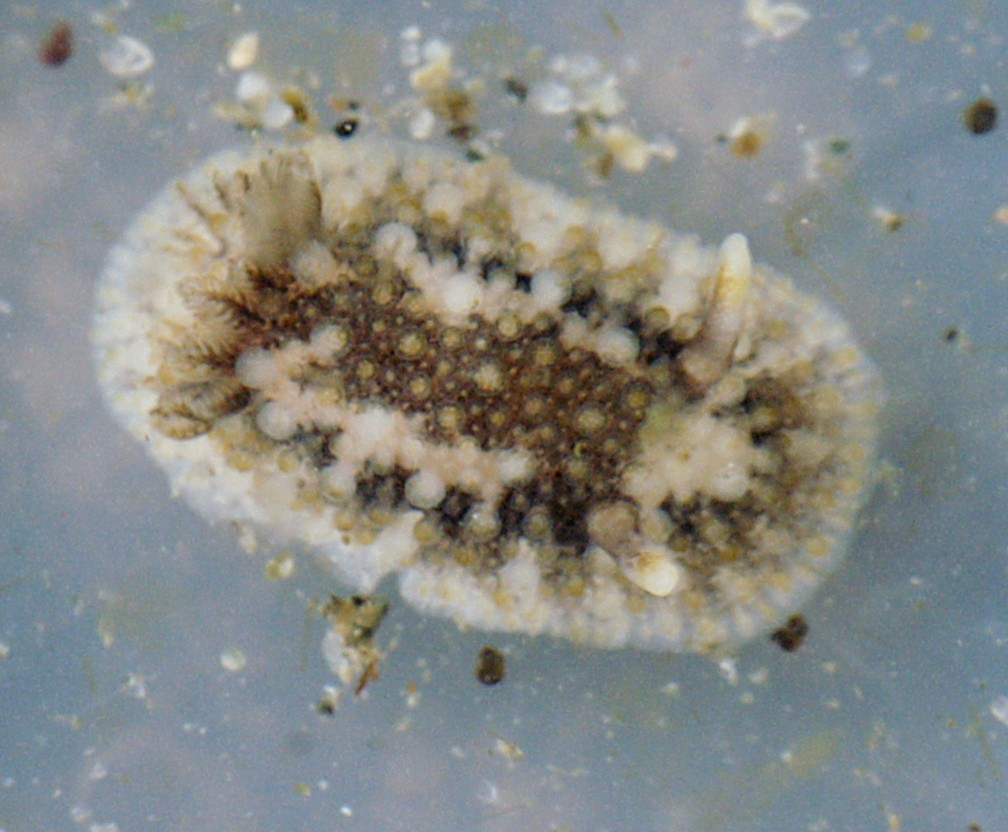
- A live individual of Onchidoris bilamellata, head end towards the right

Scientific classification
- Kingdom: Animalia
- Phylum: Mollusca
- Class: Gastropoda
- Order: Nudibranchia
- Family: Onchidorididae
- Genus: Onchidoris
- Species: O. bilamellata

Binomial name
- Onchidoris bilamellata (Linnaeus, 1767)

Synonyms
- Doris bilamellata (Linnaeus, 1758); Doris fusca Müller, 1776; Doris verrucosa Pennant, T., 1777; Onchidoris elfortiana Blainville, H.M.D. de, 1816; Doris leachii Blainville, H.M.D. de, 1816; Doris affinis Thompson, W., 1840; Doris lamellosa Johnston, G., 1842; Doris liturata Beck, H.H. in Möller, H.P.C., 1842; Doris echinata Lovén, S.L., 1846; Doris coronata Agassiz, L., 1850; Doris vulgaris Leach, W.E. in Gray, J.E., 1852; Onchidoris bilamellata liturata (f) Beck, H.H. in Bergh, L.S.R., 1878; Onchidoris bilamellata pacifica (f) Bergh, L.S.R., 1880; Ancylodoris baicalensis Dybowski, W., 1900

= Onchidoris bilamellata =

Species of gastropod

Onchidoris bilamellata, common name the rough-mantled doris, is a species of sea slug, a dorid nudibranch, a shell-less marine gastropod mollusk in the family Onchidorididae.

== Distribution ==
This nudibranch has a wide distribution, mostly in colder intertidal waters to a depth of about 20 m. It has been found in the North Atlantic and the North Sea from Britain and France to the Norwegian Sea, Iceland and Greenland; along the North American coast as far south as Connecticut. It has also been recorded in the North Pacific in the Bering Sea, and from Alaska south to northern California.

These sea slugs sometimes occur in abundant numbers during breeding time, swarming with over 1,000 individuals per square metre, as has been observed on numerous occasions. These swarms are all oriented in the same direction, determined by the flow of the tide. They follow each other at the same speed, forming columns, in different close-knit rows.

== Description ==
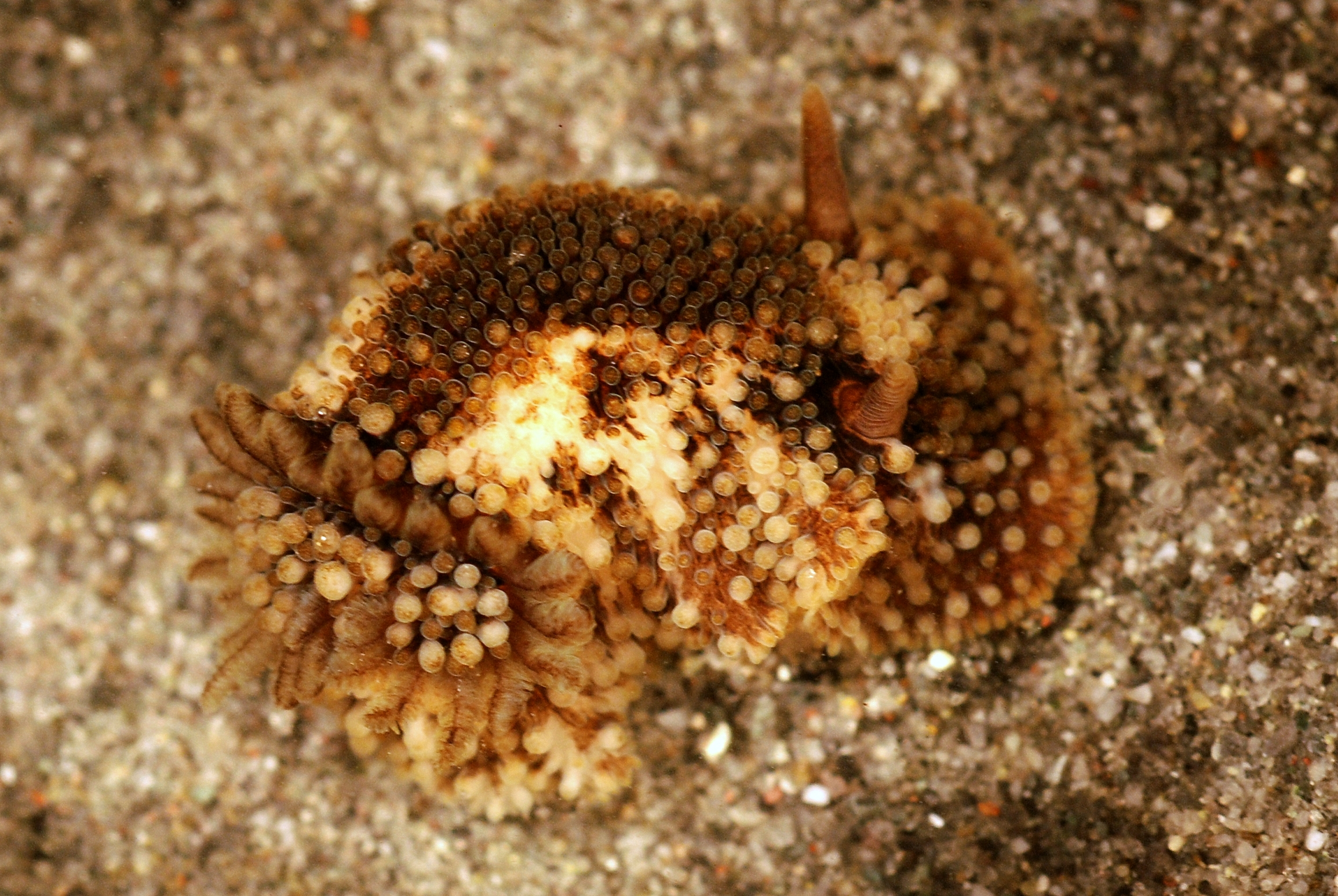
Onchidoris bilamellata with a rusty brown pattern

The maximum recorded body length is 38 mm. They mostly show an abundant rusty brown pigment. But some individuals display a mixed pattern of colours, from a lighter brown colour to dark brown. Even fewer individuals are white, with brown color only in the rhinophores and the gills. A rare few are completely white, and yet they are not albinos, as their eyes are pigmented.

Onchidoris bilamellata has a broadly oval shape with its back covered with short, knobby papillae. Their antennae are comblike. The gills are arranged in two half rings on the back at the rear end and consist of 16 to 32 simple featherlike plumes.

The branchial ganglia are fused in Onchidoris bilamellata.

== Habitat ==
Minimum recorded depth is 0 m. Maximum recorded depth is 55 m.

== Feeding habits ==
Onchidoris bilamellata feeds mainly on acorn barnacles in the genera Elminius and Balanus. It uses its rachidian tooth to chew away at the top plates of the barnacles and then sucks out the soft body.
