= Onchidoris aureopuncta =

Scientific classification
- Kingdom: Animalia
- Phylum: Mollusca
- Class: Gastropoda
- Order: Nudibranchia
- Family: Onchidorididae
- Genus: Onchidoris
- Species: O. aureopuncta

Binomial name
- Onchidoris aureopuncta (A. E. Verrill, 1901)

Species of gastropod

Onchidoris aureopuncta is a species of sea slug, a dorid nudibranch, a shell-less marine gastropod mollusc in the family Onchidorididae.

== Distribution ==
This species was described from Harrington Sound, Bermuda.
