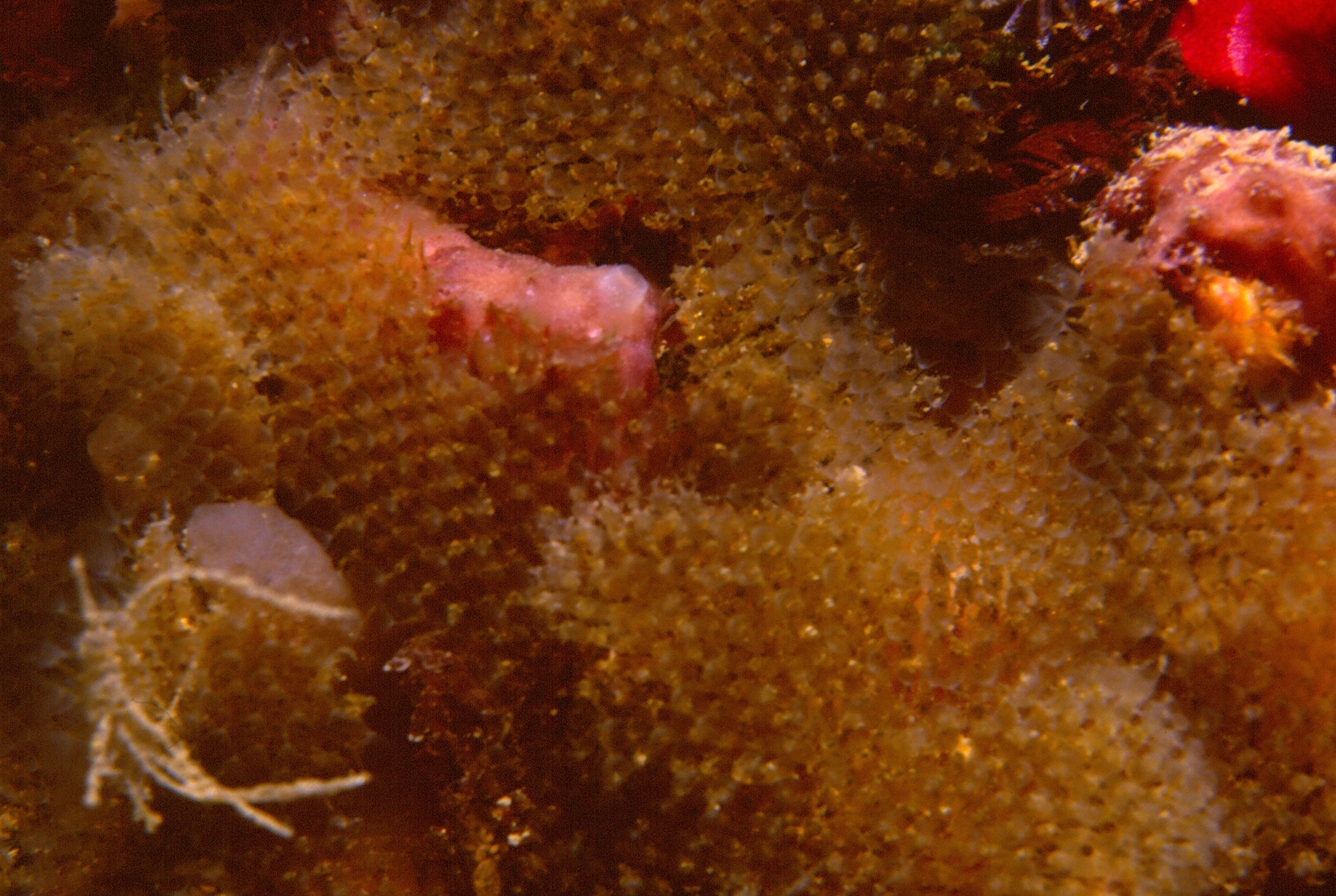

Scientific classification
- Kingdom: Animalia
- Phylum: Bryozoa
- Class: Gymnolaemata
- Order: Cheilostomatida
- Family: Beaniidae
- Genus: Beania
- Species: B. magellanica

Binomial name
- Beania magellanica (Busk, 1852)

Synonyms
- Diachoris magellanica Busk, 1852

= Beania magellanica =

Species of bryozoan

Beania magellanica is a species of colonial bryozoan in the family Beaniidae. It has a cosmopolitan distribution, occurring in shallow waters in the Atlantic and Pacific Oceans and in Antarctica.

== Taxonomy ==
This species was first described in 1852 from the Strait of Magellan, Chile, by the British naval surgeon and zoologist George Busk who gave it the name Diachoris magellanica. It was later transferred to the genus Beania, becoming Beania magellanica. Studies of specimens from several parts of its very wide range indicate that it is a species complex; new species Beania serrata from the northeast Atlantic and Beania mediterranea from the Mediterranean Sea have been described and further study is needed in other parts of its range.

== Description ==
Beania magellanica is an encrusting colonial bryozoan forming multiple, roughly circular, blades, each a few centimetres in diameter. These are held a few millimetres above the substrate, being loosely attached by fine chitinous filaments. The blades are yellowish-brown and often have turned up margins; they may overlap, or even form vertical structures on occasion. The blades are formed from a single layer of zooids, each one linked to six others, giving an appearance similar to wire mesh. The individual zooids have a cylindrical body with a chitinous exoskeleton bearing a lophophore, a crown of tentacles. The lophophores all project on the same side of the blade, usually the top, and are large enough to be seen with the naked eye.

== Distribution ==
Beania magellanica has a widespread distribution, mostly in the Southern Hemisphere; its range includes Argentina, Chile, Peru, Mexico, Falkland Islands and the Burdwood Bank, Cape Verde, South Africa, Kerguelen Islands, Prince Edward Islands, Australia, New Zealand, the Pacific coast of Japan and New Caledonia.

== Ecology ==
Beania magellanica often grows as an epibiont on sponges, gorgonians or coralline algae. It is also a fouling organism, attaching itself to the hulls of boats, and possibly rafting from one location to another on floating debris. Like other bryozoans, the zooids feed on diatoms and organic particles which the lophophores extract from the water flowing past. The food particles are passed to the central mouth. A colony's zooids are interconnected, enabling them to share food with each other. Colonies expand by budding off new zooids. Under certain circumstances, specialised reproductive zooids develop. The embryos are brooded at first and then have a short planktonic larval stage, before settling on a suitable substrate to found a new colony. Various sea slugs feed on the zooids, and this bryozoan is intolerant of pollution by heavy metals such as copper.
