= Acanthomira =

Scientific classification
- Kingdom: Animalia
- Phylum: Mollusca
- Class: Gastropoda
- Order: Nudibranchia
- Family: Onchidorididae
- Genus: Acanthomira; Ekimova, Nikitenko, Stanovova, Schepetov, Antokhina & Á. Valdés, 2024

Type species
- Acanthodoris uchidai Baba, 1935

Genus of gastropods

Acanthomira is a genus of sea slugs, dorid nudibranchs, shell-less marine gastropod mollusks in the family Onchidorididae.

== Species ==
- Acanthomira uchidai (Baba, 1935)
- Acanthomira bulgakovi Martynov & Korshunova, 2025 (unavailable name)
