= Beania =

Scientific classification
- Kingdom: Animalia
- Phylum: Bryozoa
- Class: Gymnolaemata
- Order: Cheilostomatida
- Family: Beaniidae
- Genus: Beania; Johnston, 1840

Synonyms
- Chaunosia Busk, 1867; Diachoris Busk, 1852; Dimorphozoum Levinsen, 1909

Genus of bryozoans

Beania is a genus of bryozoans belonging to the family Beaniidae.

The genus has a cosmopolitan distribution.

== Species ==
The following species are recognised in the genus Beania:

- Beania admiranda Packard, 1863
- Beania alaskensis Osburn, 1950
- Beania americana Vieira, Migotto & Winston, 2010
- Beania aspinosa Liu, 1984
- Beania asymmetrica Harmer, 1926
- Beania australis Busk, 1852
- Beania australopacifica Tilbrook, 2006
- †Beania bermudezi Lagaaij, 1968
- Beania bilaminata (Hincks, 1881)
- Beania carteri (Hincks, 1880)
- Beania challengeri Hastings, 1943
- Beania clavata (Hincks, 1887)
- Beania columbiana O'Donoghue, 1923
- Beania conferta MacGillivray, 1886
- Beania cookae Tilbrook, Hayward & Gordon, 2001
- Beania correiae Vieira, Migotto & Winston, 2010
- Beania costata (Busk, 1876)
- Beania cribrimorpha Gordon, 1984
- Beania crotali (Busk, 1852)
- Beania cryptophragma Gordon, 1986
- Beania cupulariensis Osburn, 1914
- Beania cylindrica (Hincks, 1886)
- Beania decumbens MacGillivray, 1882
- Beania diademata Cheetham, 1972
- Beania discodermiae (Ortmann, 1890)
- Beania distans (Hincks, 1881)
- Beania elongata (Hincks, 1885)
- Beania erecta Waters, 1904
- Beania farreae Liu, 1982
- Beania fragilis (Ridley, 1881)
- Beania gigantavicularis Gordon, 1984
- Beania hexaceras (Ortmann, 1890)
- Beania hexamicorum Tilbrook, Hayward & Gordon, 2001
- Beania hirtissima (Heller, 1867)
- Beania hyadesi (Jullien, 1888)
- Beania inermis (Busk, 1852)
- Beania intermedia (Hincks, 1881)
- Beania klugei Cook, 1968
- Beania lagenula Tilbrook, 2006
- Beania livingstonei Hastings, 1943
- Beania magellanica (Busk, 1852)
- Beania maxilla (Jullien, 1888)
- Beania maxilladentata Ramalho, Muricy & Taylor, 2010
- Beania mediterranea Souto, Nascimento, Reverter-Gil & Vieira, 2019
- Beania metrii Vieira, Migotto & Winston, 2010
- Beania minuspina Florence, Hayward & Gibbons, 2007
- Beania mirabilis Johnston, 1840
- Beania mirabilissima Vieira, Migotto & Winston, 2010
- Beania multispinosa Gontar, 1993
- Beania octaceras Okada & Mawatari, 1938
- Beania pauciserialis Berning & Wisshak, 2024
- Beania paucispinosa O'Donoghue & de Watteville, 1935
- Beania pectinata Hayward & Ryland, 1995
- Beania petiolata Harmer, 1926
- Beania plurispinosa Uttley & Bullivant, 1972
- Beania proboscidea Gordon, 1986
- Beania pseudocolumbiana Gontar, 1993
- Beania pulchella Livingstone, 1929
- Beania quadricornuta (Hincks, 1885)
- Beania rediviva Hayward & Cook, 1983
- Beania regularis Thornely, 1916
- Beania scotti Hastings, 1943
- Beania serrata Souto, Nascimento, Reverter-Gil & Vieira, 2019
- Beania spinigera (MacGillivray, 1860)
- Beania stonycha Gordon, 1986
- Beania superhispida Winston & Jackson, 2021
- Beania thula Hayward, 1994
- Beania trampida Gordon, 1986
- Beania uniarmata O'Donoghue & de Watteville, 1944
- Beania vanhoeffeni Kluge, 1914
- Beania vegae Silén, 1941
- Beania wilsoni MacGillivray, 1885
