= Sclavonia =

Sclavonia may refer to:

- Sclavonia, archaic English (via Latin) designation for the region of Slavonia, now part of Croatia
- Sclavonia, archaic English (via Latin) designation for the region of Scalovia, in former Prussia
- Occasionally, parts of the Kingdom of Hungary (Upper Hungary), inhabited by Slovaks
- In general, a common Latin designation for various regions inhabited by Sclavoni (Slavs)

== See also ==
- Sclavi (disambiguation)
- Sclavia (disambiguation)
- Slavia (disambiguation)
- Slavija (disambiguation)
