= Onchimira =

Scientific classification
- Kingdom: Animalia
- Phylum: Mollusca
- Class: Gastropoda
- Order: Nudibranchia
- Family: Onchidorididae
- Genus: Onchimira; Martynov, Korshunova, Sanamyan N. & Sanamyan K., 2009

Diversity
- 1 species only

Genus of gastropods

Onchimira is a genus of sea slugs, dorid nudibranchs, shell-less marine gastropod molluscs in the family Onchidorididae.

== Species ==
- Onchimira cavifera Martynov, Korshunova, Sanamyan & Sanamyan, 2009
