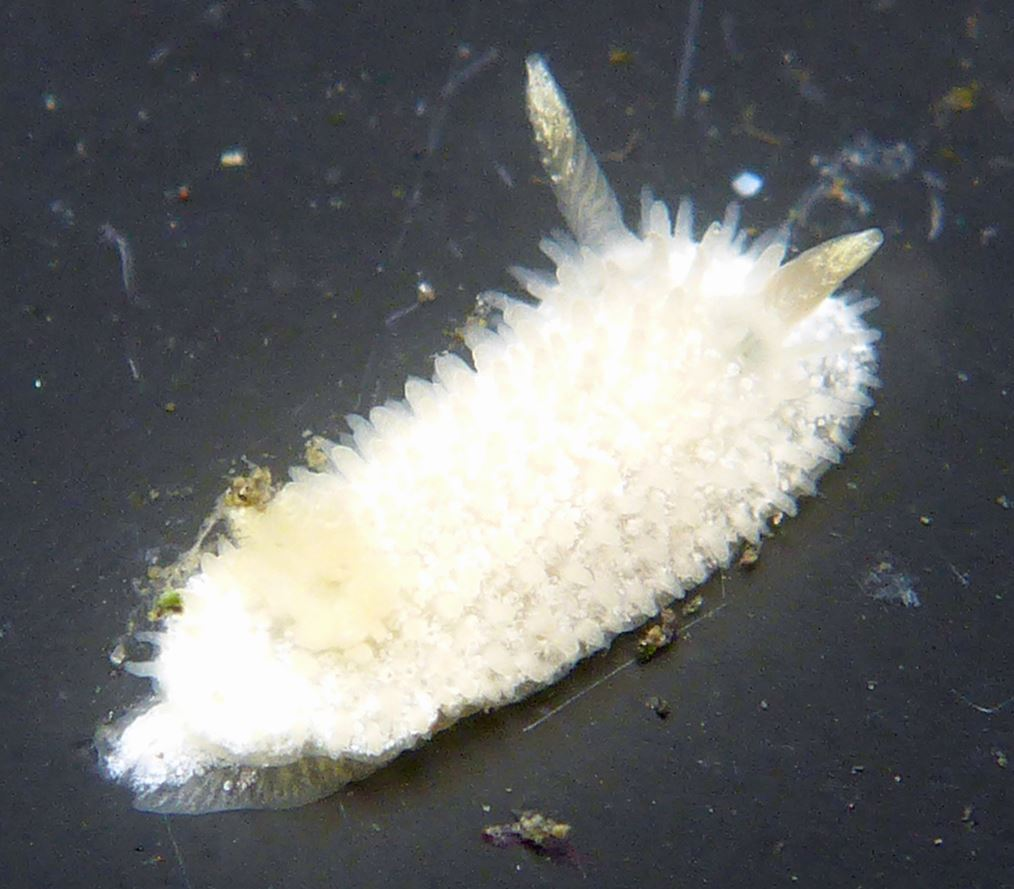
- Diaphorodoris lirulatocauda from Princeton Harbor, California

Scientific classification
- Kingdom: Animalia
- Phylum: Mollusca
- Class: Gastropoda
- Order: Nudibranchia
- Family: Calycidorididae
- Genus: Diaphorodoris
- Species: D. lirulatocauda

Binomial name
- Diaphorodoris lirulatocauda Millen, 1985

= Diaphorodoris lirulatocauda =

Species of gastropod

Diaphorodoris lirulatocauda is a species of sea slug, a dorid nudibranch, a shell-less marine gastropod mollusc in the family Calycidorididae.

== Distribution ==
This species was described from Earl's Cove, British Columbia, 49°45′N 124°01′W. It occurs from Alaska south to Baja California, Mexico.
