= Slavija =

Slavija (Cyrillic: Славија) may refer to:

- the Serbo-Croatian, Macedonian and Slovene name for Slavia, a general term for an area inhabited by Slavs.

== Places ==
- Slavija Square, a public square in Belgrade, Serbia
- Slavija (Novi Sad), a former municipality of the city of Novi Sad in Serbia

== Sports ==
- FK Slavija Beograd, football club from Belgrade, Serbia
- FK Slavija Kragujevac, football club from Kragujevac, Serbia
- FK Slavija Pržino, football club from Pržino, North Macedonia
- FK Slavija Sarajevo, football club from Sarajevo, Bosnia and Herzegovina
- JŠK Slavija Osijek, a former football club from Osijek, Croatia
- NK Slavija Vevče, a former football club from Ljubljana, Slovenia
- OFK Slavija Novi Sad, football club from Novi Sad, Serbia

== See also ==
- Slavia (disambiguation)
- Sclavonia (disambiguation)
