= Sclavia =

Sclavia may refer to:

- Sclavia, in medieval history a common Latin term for any region inhabited by the Slavs (Sclavi)
- Sclavia craton, an ancient geological formation of the Archean period
- Sclavia, older name for the town of Liberi

== See also ==
- Sclavi (disambiguation)
- Sclavonia (disambiguation)
