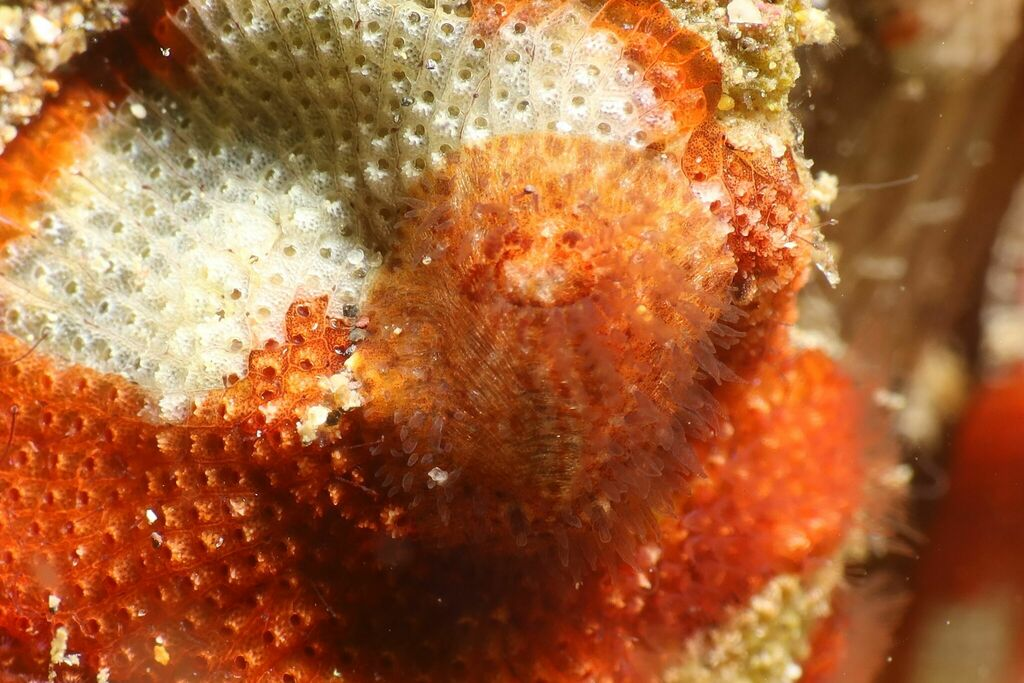

Scientific classification
- Kingdom: Animalia
- Phylum: Mollusca
- Class: Gastropoda
- Order: Nudibranchia
- Family: Onchidorididae
- Genus: Idaliadoris
- Species: I. neapolitana

Binomial name
- Idaliadoris neapolitana (Delle Chiaje, 1841)

Synonyms
- Atalodoris neapolitana (Delle Chiaje, 1841) superseded combination; Idalia neapolitana Delle Chiaje, 1841 ([basionym]); Knoutsodonta neapolitana (Delle Chiaje, 1841) superseded combination; Onchidoris neapolitana (Delle Chiaje, 1841)

= Idaliadoris neapolitana =

Species of gastropod

Idaliadoris neapolitana is a species of sea slug, a dorid nudibranch, a shell-less marine gastropod mollusc in the family Onchidorididae.

== Distribution ==
This species was described from Naples, Italy. It has also been reported from Numana, Ancona, Italy and the Mediterranean Sea coast of Spain.

== Diet ==
Idaliadoris neapolitana feeds on the bryozoan Schizobrachiella sanguinea.
