= Onchimira cavifera =

Scientific classification
- Kingdom: Animalia
- Phylum: Mollusca
- Class: Gastropoda
- Order: Nudibranchia
- Family: Onchidorididae
- Genus: Onchimira
- Species: O. cavifera

Binomial name
- Onchimira cavifera Martynov, Korshunova, Sanamyan & Sanamyan, 2009

Species of gastropod

Onchimira cavifera is a species of sea slug, a dorid nudibranch, a shell-less marine gastropod mollusc in the family Onchidorididae.

== Distribution ==
This species was described from Starichkov Island, near the Kamchatka peninsula, northwest Pacific Ocean.

== Description ==
The size of the body attains 26 mm.
