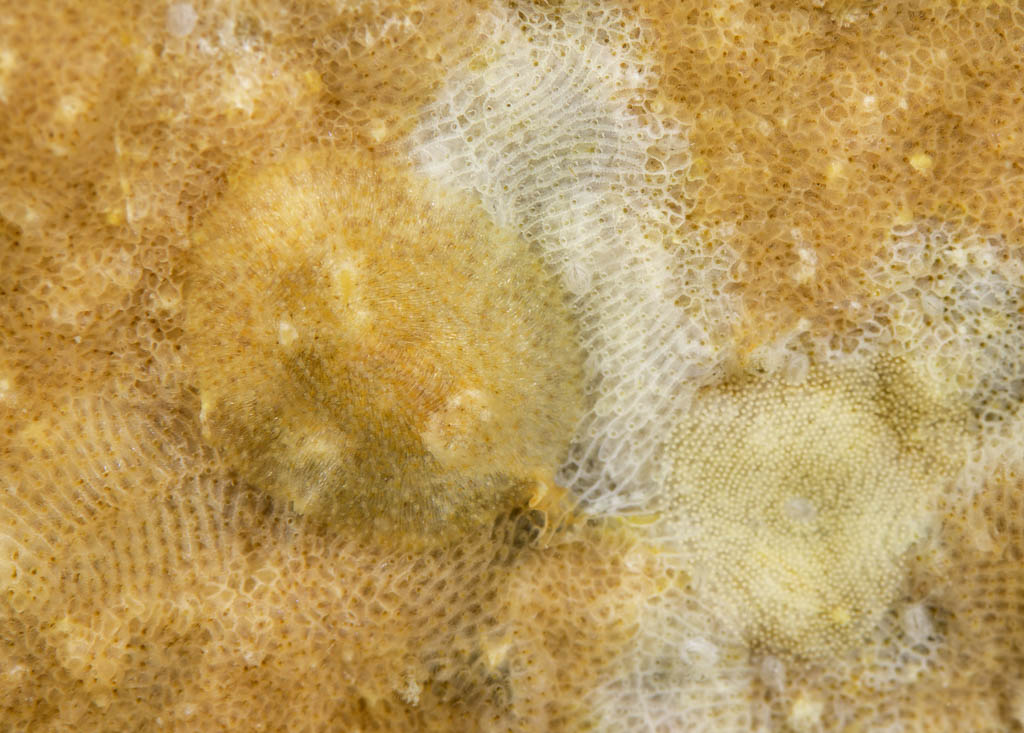
- The nudibranch Idaliadoris depressa, Strangford Lough, Northern Ireland.

Scientific classification
- Kingdom: Animalia
- Phylum: Mollusca
- Class: Gastropoda
- Order: Nudibranchia
- Family: Onchidorididae
- Genus: Idaliadoris
- Species: I. depressa

Binomial name
- Idaliadoris depressa (Alder & Hancock, 1842)

Synonyms
- Atalodoris depressa (Alder & Hancock, 1842) superseded combination; Doris depressa Alder & Hancock, 1842; Knoutsodonta depressa (Alder & Hancock, 1842) superseded combination; Onchidoris depressa (Alder & Hancock, 1842)

= Idaliadoris depressa =

Species of gastropod

Idaliadoris depressa is a species of sea slug, a dorid nudibranch, a shell-less marine gastropod mollusc in the family Onchidorididae.

== Description ==
(Original description) The body is notably depressed and transparent, with a pale sandy color and distinct spots of orange or reddish brown.

The cloak is covered in delicate, pointed papillae and contains strong, embedded spicules arranged in a transverse pattern across the back and diagonally on each side. The dorsal tentacles are a pale yellow.

The gill apparatus consists of ten to eleven very short, simple, and transparent white plumes, which are arranged in a horseshoe shape around the vent.

The foot is broad, with a truncated anterior end, and is a pale grayish-pink color. The veil above the mouth is large and semicircular.

== Distribution ==
This species was described from Whitley Bay, Northumberland, England. It is currently known from Norway south to the Atlantic coast of France and the Mediterranean Sea. Reports from other parts of the world are doubtful and specimens from Brasil have been described as Knoutsodonta brasiliensis.
