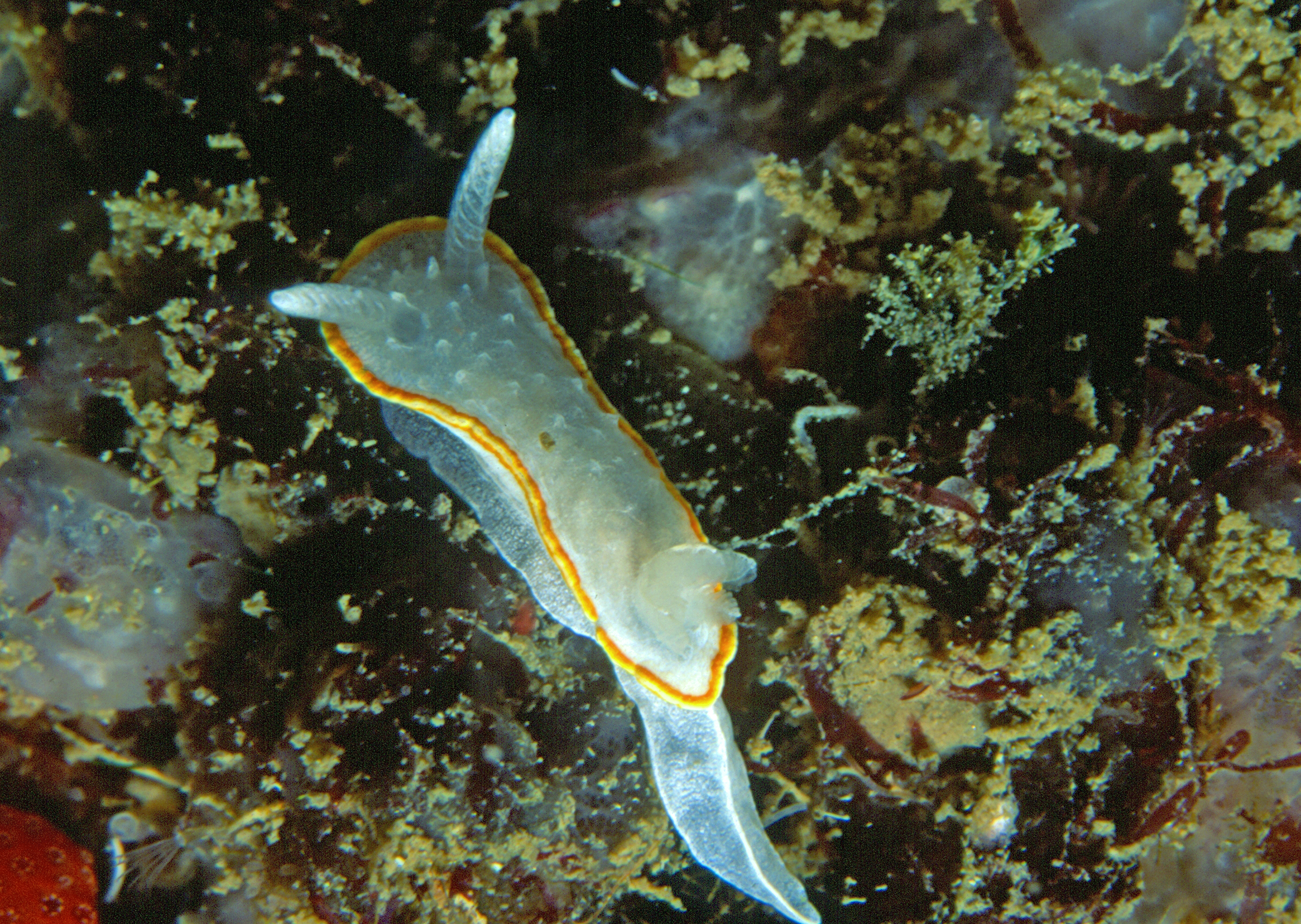
- Diaphorodoris alba, Banyuls-sur-Mer, France

Scientific classification
- Kingdom: Animalia
- Phylum: Mollusca
- Class: Gastropoda
- Order: Nudibranchia
- Family: Calycidorididae
- Genus: Diaphorodoris; Iredale & O'Donoghue, 1923

Type species
- Doris luteocincta M. Sars, 1870

Diversity
- 5 species

= Diaphorodoris =

Genus of gastropods

Diaphorodoris is a genus of sea slugs, dorid nudibranchs, shell-less marine gastropod mollusks in the family Calycidorididae.

== Species ==
Species within this genus include:

- Diaphorodoris alba Portmann & Sandmeier, 1960
- Diaphorodoris lirulatocauda Millen, 1985
- Diaphorodoris luteocincta (M. Sars, 1870)
- Diaphorodoris mitsuii (Baba, 1938)
- Diaphorodoris papillata Portmann & Sandmeier, 1960
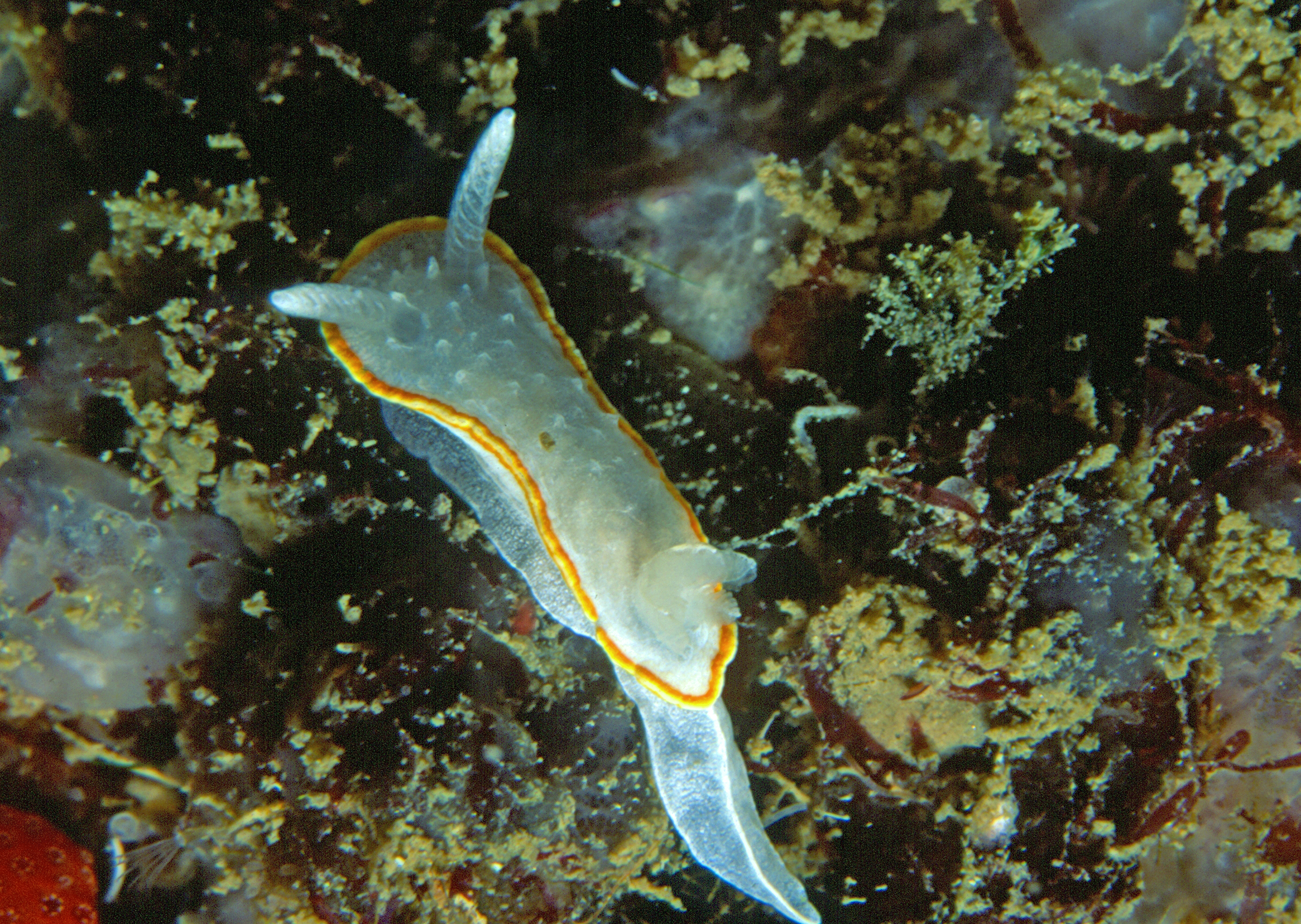
Diaphorodoris alba

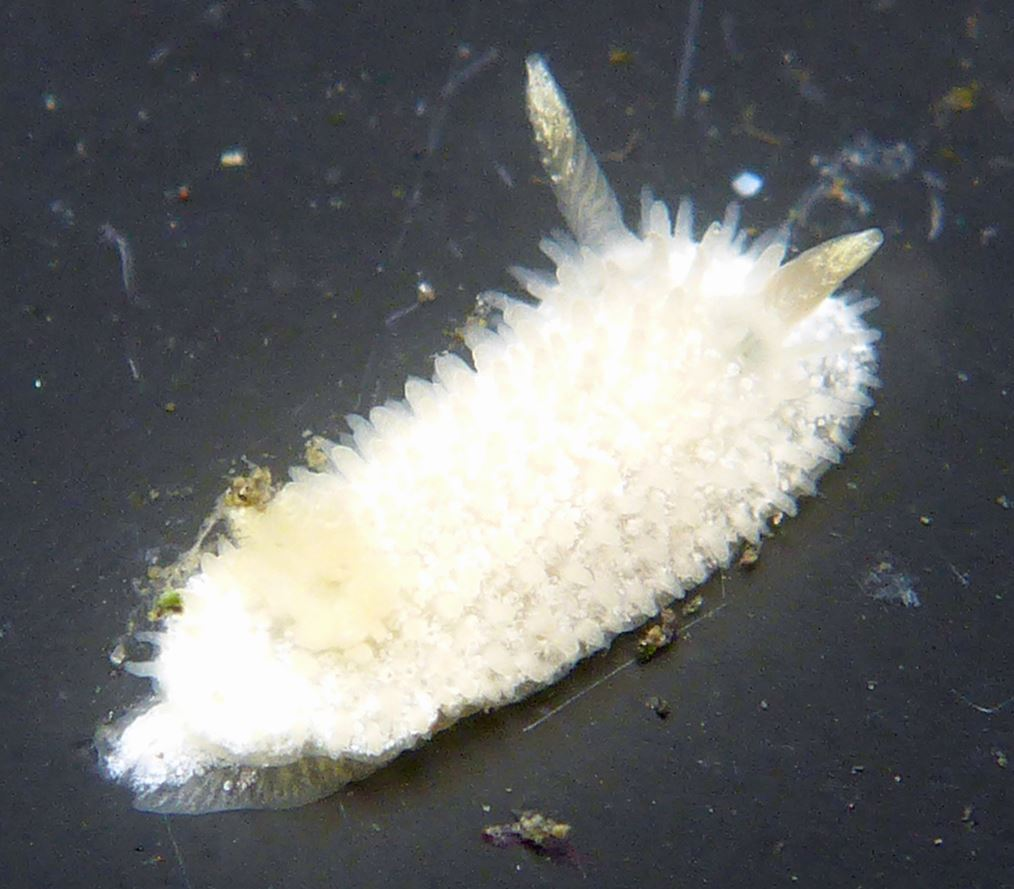
Diaphorodoris lirulatocauda

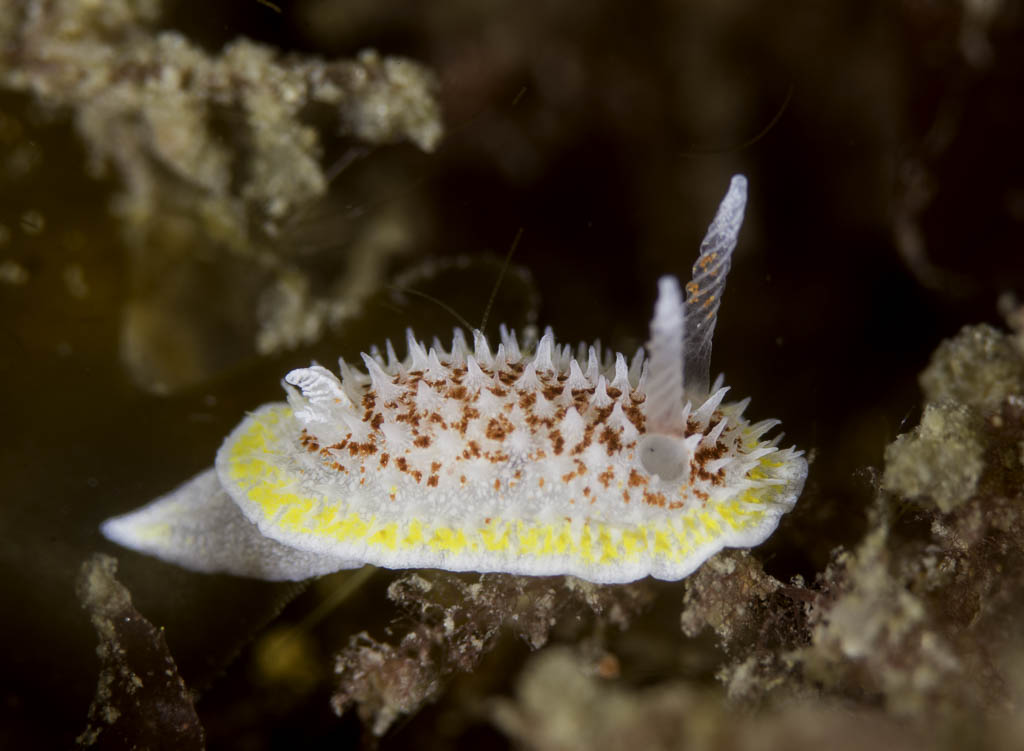
Diaphorodoris luteocincta

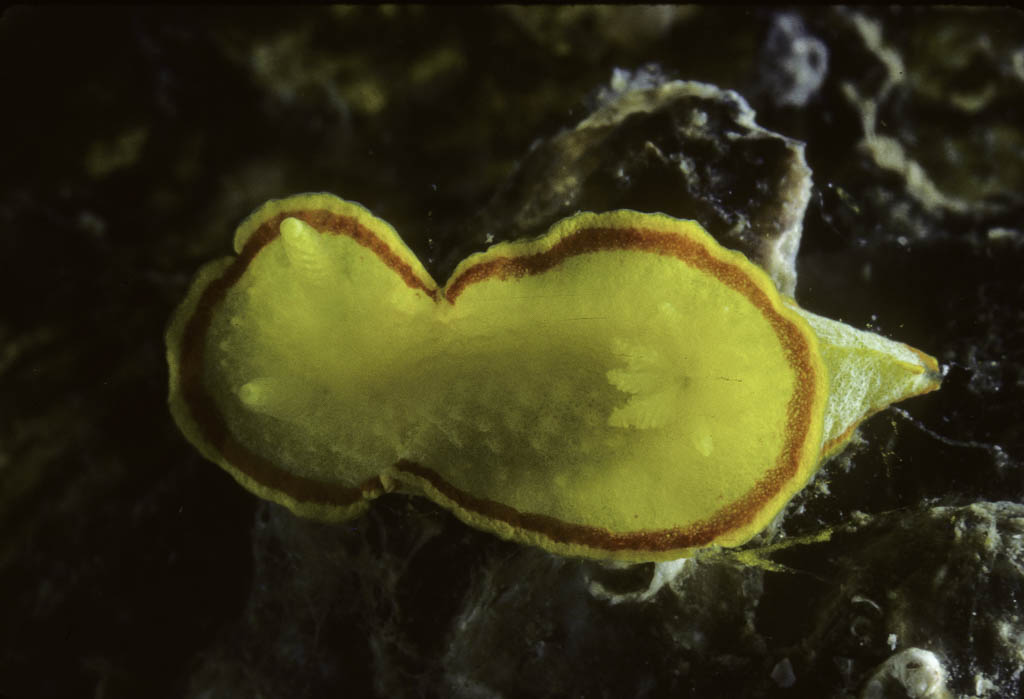
Diaphorodoris mitsuii

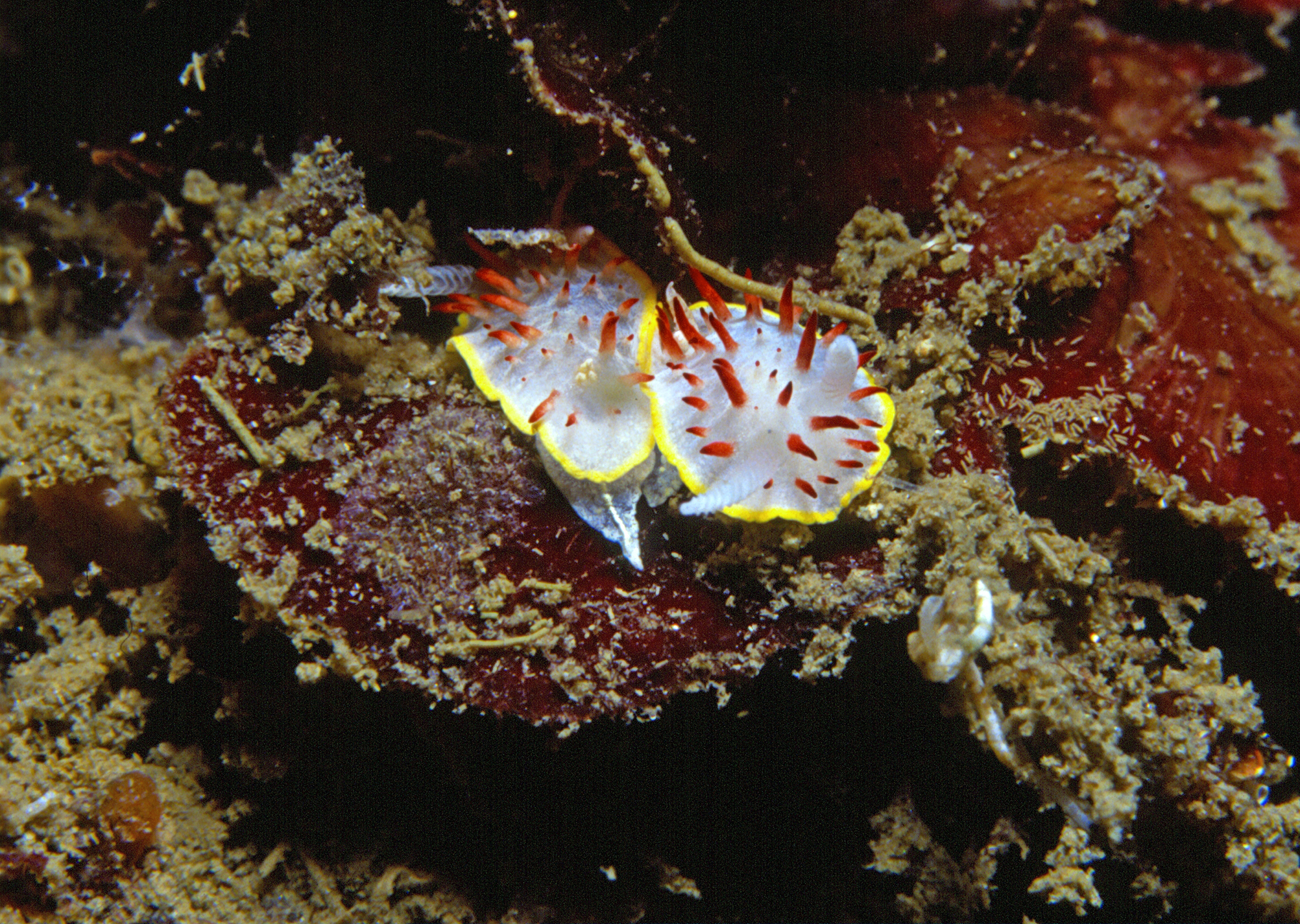
Diaphorodoris papillata
