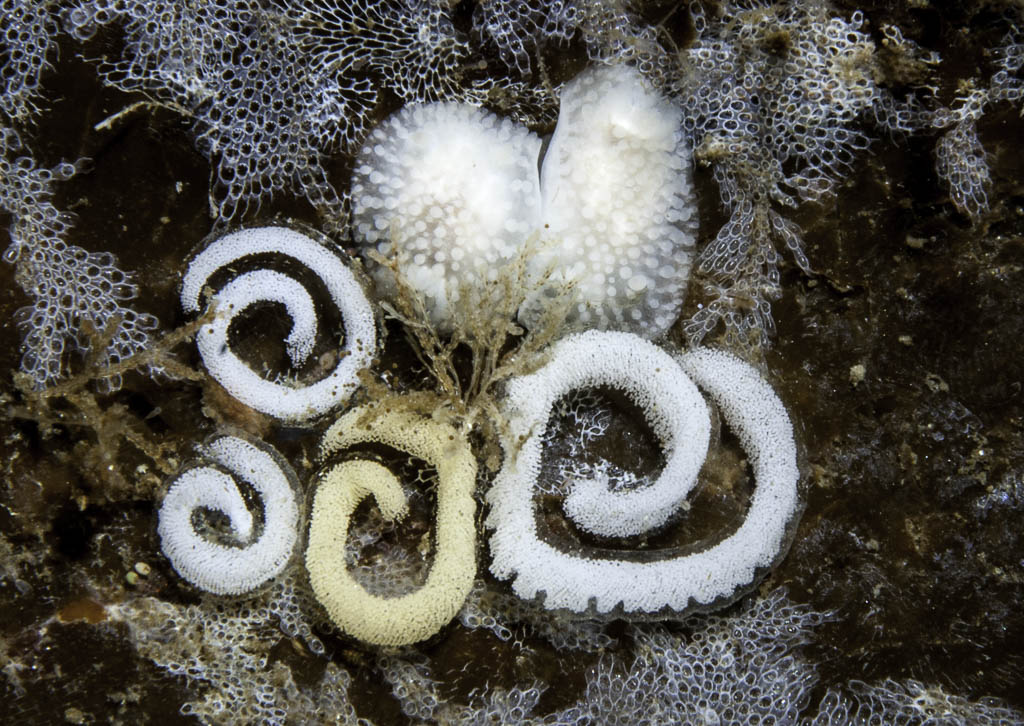
- Two specimens of the nudibranch Onchidoris muricata with egg spirals, Gulen Dive Resort, Norway.

Scientific classification
- Domain: Eukaryota
- Kingdom: Animalia
- Phylum: Mollusca
- Class: Gastropoda
- Order: Nudibranchia
- Superfamily: Onchidoridoidea
- Family: Onchidorididae
- Genus: Onchidoris
- Species: O. muricata

Binomial name
- Onchidoris muricata (O. F. Müller, 1776)

Synonyms
- Doris muricata O. F. Müller, 1776; Doris aspera Alder & Hancock, 1842; Doris diaphana Alder & Hancock, 1845; Doris ulidiana Thompson W., 1845; Lamellidoris aspera (Alder & Hancock, 1842); Lamellidoris diaphana (Alder & Hancock, 1845); Lamellidoris muricata (O. F. Müller, 1776); Onchidoris aspera (Alder & Hancock, 1842)

= Onchidoris muricata =

Species of gastropod

Onchidoris muricata is a species of sea slug, a dorid nudibranch, a shell-less marine gastropod mollusc in the family Onchidorididae.

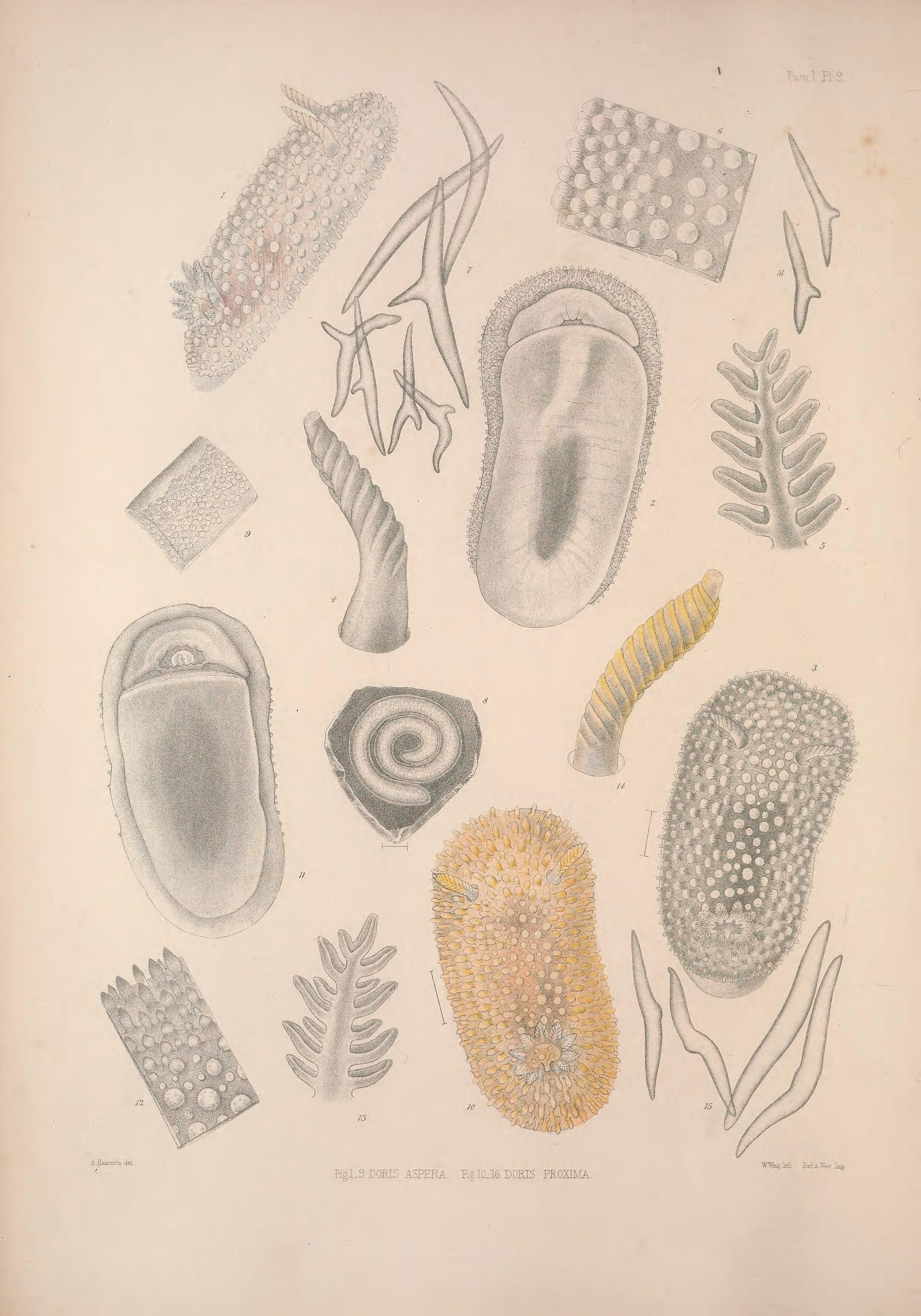
Colour plate from Alder & Hancock Monograph, 1845-55, figs 1-9.

== Distribution ==
This species was described from Norway. It is currently known from the European coasts of the North Atlantic Ocean as far south as the British Isles and the north-west Atlantic as far south as Maine. It is reported from the north-east Pacific Ocean coasts of North America from Friday Harbor, Washington south to Lion Rock, San Luis Obispo County, California.
