= Beaniidae =

Scientific classification
- Kingdom: Animalia
- Phylum: Bryozoa
- Class: Gymnolaemata
- Order: Cheilostomatida
- Suborder: Flustrina
- Superfamily: Buguloidea
- Family: Beaniidae; Canu & Bassler, 1927

Genera
- 3, see text

Family of moss animals

Beaniidae is a family of bryozoans in the order Cheilostomatida. Their zooids have a weak box-like shell of calcium carbonate as do most species of the suborder Flustrina, and in this family are typically arranged disjunctly, connected by small tubes, and often boat-shaped. One species, Amphibiobeania epiphylla, is the only known amphibious bryozoan known as of 2008/09.

== Genera ==
The following genera are recognised in the family Beaniidae:

- Amphibiobeania Metcalfe, Gordon & Hayward, 2007
- Beania Johnston, 1840
- Stolonella Hincks, 1883
