= Idaliadoris brasiliensis =

Scientific classification
- Kingdom: Animalia
- Phylum: Mollusca
- Class: Gastropoda
- Order: Nudibranchia
- Family: Onchidorididae
- Genus: Idaliadoris
- Species: I. brasiliensis

Binomial name
- Idaliadoris brasiliensis (Alvim, Padula & Pimenta, 2011)

Synonyms
- Atalodoris brasiliensis (Alvim, Padula & Pimenta, 2011) superseded combination; Knoutsodonta brasiliensis (Alvim, Padula & Pimenta, 2011) superseded combination; Onchidoris brasiliensis (Alvim, Padula & Pimenta, 2011)

Species of gastropod

Idaliadoris brasiliensis is a species of sea slug, a dorid nudibranch, a shell-less marine gastropod mollusc in the family Onchidorididae.

== Distribution ==
This species was described from Praia do Forno, Arraial do Cabo, State of Rio de Janeiro, Brazil.

== Diet ==
The animals feed and lay eggs on the bryozoan Parasmittina protecta (Thornely, 1905).
