= Slavia =

Slavia may refer to:

== Toponymy ==
- Slavia, a general term for an area inhabited by Slavs
- Slawiya, one of the tribal centers of early East Slavs
- The medieval name for the Wendish settlement area
- The medieval name for the duchy of Pomerania
- The medieval name for Mecklenburg
- The medieval name for the Rani principality
- A term for the objective of Pan-Slavism of forming a united Slavic state
- Slavia Friulana, a small mountainous region in northeastern Italy
- Slavia, Florida, an unincorporated community in Seminole County

== Sports ==
- SK Slavia Prague, a Czech football club
  - SK Slavia Praha (women), football
  - Slavia Prague (juniors), a men's junior football club
  - BC Slavia Prague, now USK Praha, basketball
  - SK Slavia Prague Basketball, basketball
  - DHC Slavia Prague, women's handball
  - HC Slavia Prague, ice hockey
  - RC Slavia Prague, rugby union
- Slavia Sofia (sports club), based in Sofia, Bulgaria
  - PFC Slavia Sofia, football
  - Slavia Stadium in Sofia
  - BC Slavia Sofia, basketball
  - HC Slavia Sofia, ice hockey
- FC Slavia Mozyr, a Belarusian football club
- FK Slavia Orlová-Lutyně, a Czech football club
- HK Slávia Partizánske, a Slovak women's handball club
- Slavia Louňovice, a Czech football club
- Slavia Melbourne, an Australian football club
- FC Slavia Karlovy Vary, a Czech football club
- FK Slavija Sarajevo, a Bosnian football club
- Slavia Rivne, a Ukrainian football club
- Slavia Kyiv, a Ukrainian women's football club

== Other uses ==
- Slavia (band), a Norwegian black metal band
- Slavia (Ghent), the faculty of Eastern European studies at Ghent University, Belgium
- Škoda Slavia, a subcompact sedan/saloon sold in India

== See also ==
- Slavija (disambiguation), for the Bosnian, Croatian, Macedonian, Serbian and Slovenian spelling
- Sclavonia (disambiguation)
