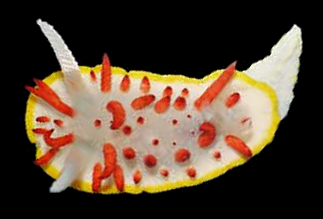
- Diaphorodoris papillata

Scientific classification
- Kingdom: Animalia
- Phylum: Mollusca
- Class: Gastropoda
- Order: Nudibranchia
- Superfamily: Onchidoridoidea
- Family: Calycidorididae; Roginskaya, 1972

= Calycidorididae =

Family of gastropods

Calycidorididae are a taxonomic family of sea slugs, dorid nudibranchs, marine gastropod molluscs in the superfamily Onchidoridoidea.

== Genera ==
Genera in the family Calycidorididae include:

- Calycidoris Abraham, 1876
- Diaphorodoris Iredale & O'Donoghue, 1923

The following genera are currently considered to be synonyms or have been transferred to another family:

- Lamellidoridella Baba, 1938: synonym of Diaphorodoris Iredale & O'Donoghue, 1923
