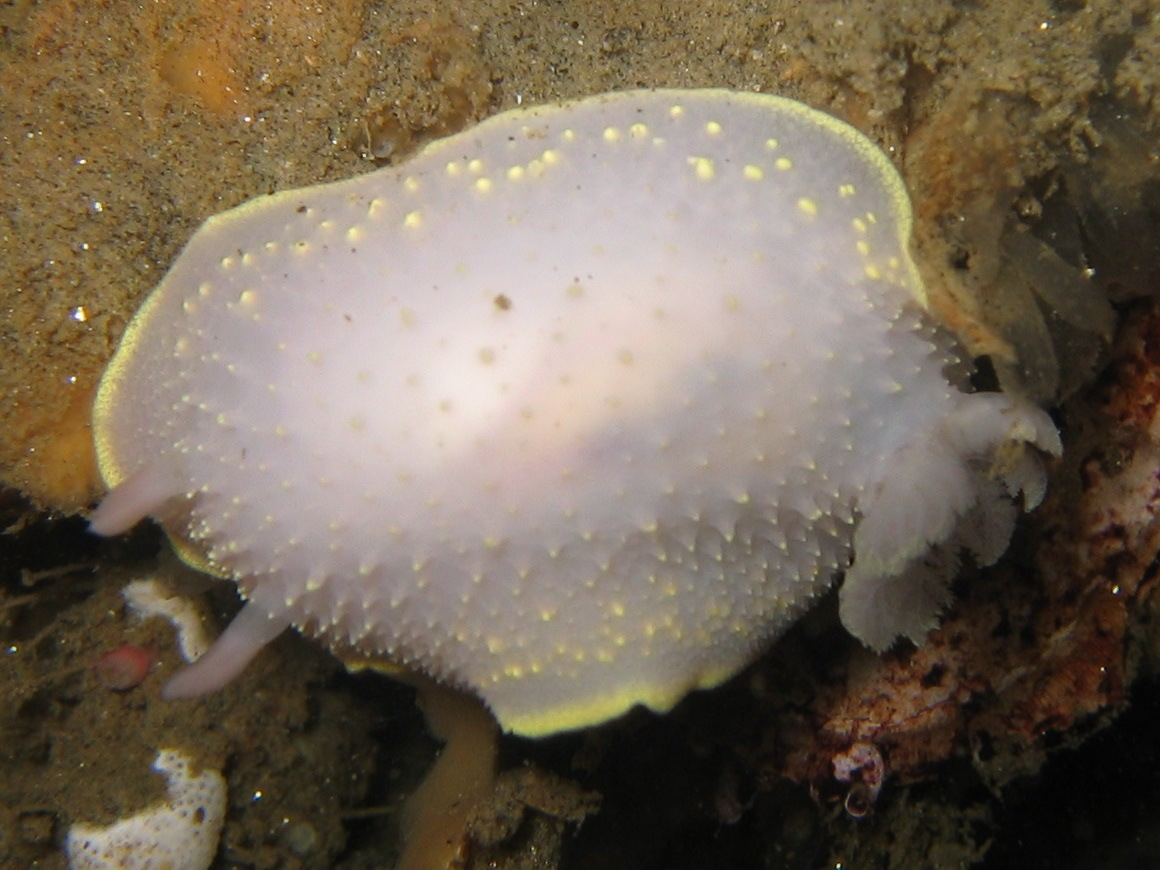
- Acanthodoris hudsoni in the Onchidorididae

Scientific classification
- Kingdom: Animalia
- Phylum: Mollusca
- Class: Gastropoda
- Order: Nudibranchia
- Infraorder: Doridoidei
- Superfamily: Onchidoridoidea; Gray, 1827

Families
- See text

Synonyms
- Onchidoridacea (incorrect suffix for superfamilia)

= Onchidoridoidea =

Superfamily of gastropods

Onchidoridoidea is a taxonomic superfamily of sea slugs, dorid nudibranchs, marine gastropod molluscs.

== Families ==
Families within the superfamily Onchidoridoidea are as follows:

- Acanthodorididae P. Fischer, 1883
- Acanthomiridae Martynov & Korshunova, 2025
- Aegiridae P. Fischer, 1883
- Akiodorididae Millen & Martynov 2005
- Calycidorididae Roginskaya, 1972
- Corambidae Bergh, 1871
- Goniodorididae H. Adams & A. Adams, 1854
- Onchidorididae Gray, 1827
- Onchimiridae Martynov & Korshunova, 2025

Synonyms

- Acanthomiridae Martynov & Korshunova, 2025 (unavailable name)
- Aegiretidae P. Fischer, 1883: synonym of Aegiridae P. Fischer, 1883 (incorrect subsequent spelling)
- Ancylodorididae Thiele, 1926: synonym of Onchidorididae Gray, 1827 (junior subjective synonym)
- Lamellidorididae Pruvot-Fol, 1933: synonym of Onchidorididae Gray, 1827
- Notodorididae Eliot, 1910: synonym of Aegiridae P. Fischer, 1883
- Okeniidae Iredale & O'Donoghue, 1923: synonym of Goniodorididae H. Adams & A. Adams, 1854
- Onchimiridae Martynov & Korshunova, 2025 (unavailable name, publication does not satisfy ICZN Art. 8.1.2)
