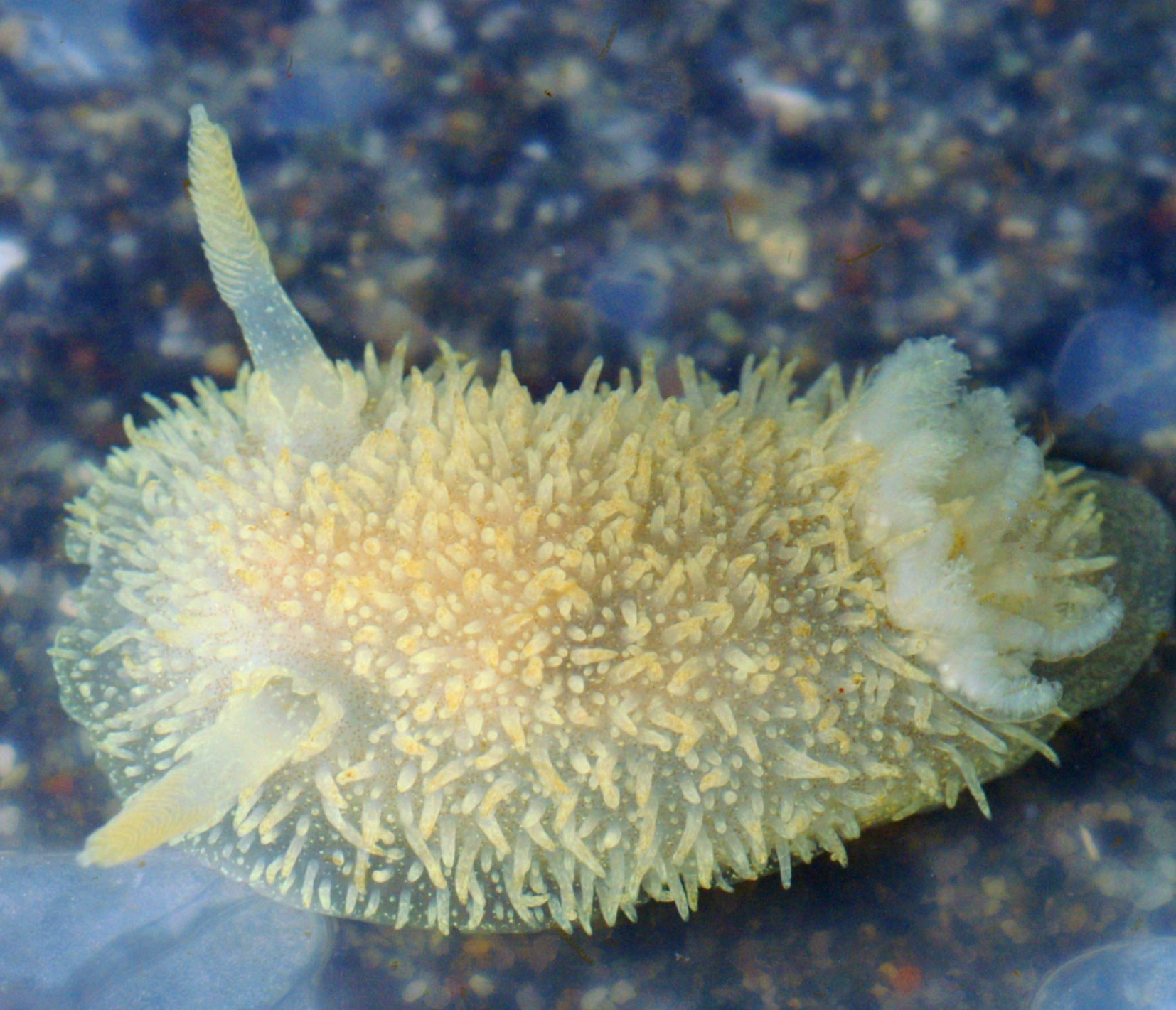
- A live individual of Acanthodoris pilosa, head end towards the left

Scientific classification
- Kingdom: Animalia
- Phylum: Mollusca
- Class: Gastropoda
- Order: Nudibranchia
- Superfamily: Onchidoridoidea
- Family: Onchidorididae; Gray, 1854

= Onchidorididae =

Family of gastropods

Onchidorididae are a taxonomic family of sea slugs, dorid nudibranchs, marine gastropod molluscs in the superfamily Onchidoridoidea.

== Genera ==
Genera in the family Onchodorididae include:

- Acanthomira Ekimova, Nikitenko, Stanovova, Schepetov, Antokhina & Á. Valdés, 2024
- Adalaria Bergh, 1878
- Atalodoris Iredale & O'Donoghue, 1923. Idaliadoris Furfaro & Trainito, 2022
- Onchidoris Blainville, 1816 - synonym: Adalaria Bergh, 1879, Lamellidoris Alder and Hancock, 1855
- Onchimira Martynov, Korshunova, N. Sanamyan & K. Sanamyan, 2009 with only one species Onchimira cavifera Martynov, Korshunova, N. Sanamyan & K. Sanamyan, 2009

The following genera are currently considered to be synonyms or have been transferred to another family:

- Akiodoris Bergh, 1879 transferred to family Akiodorididae
- Doridunculus G. O. Sars, 1878 transferred to family Akiodorididae
- Hypobranchiaea A. Adams, 1847 - taxon inquirendum
- Knoutsodonta Hallas & Gosliner, 2015: synonym of Atalodoris Iredale & O'Donoghue, 1923 (junior subjective synonym)
