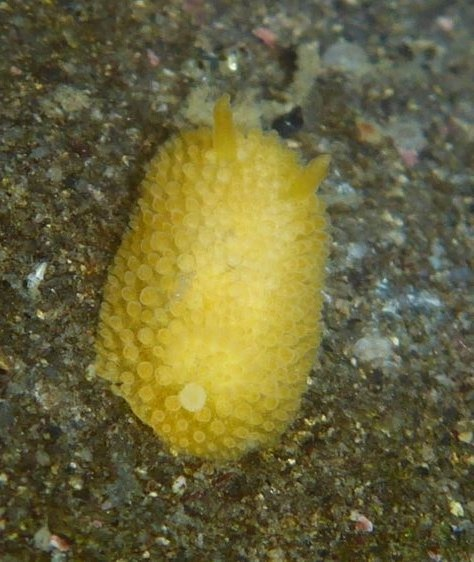

Scientific classification
- Kingdom: Animalia
- Phylum: Mollusca
- Class: Gastropoda
- Order: Nudibranchia
- Family: Onchidorididae
- Genus: Atalodoris
- Species: A. jannae

Binomial name
- Atalodoris jannae (Millen, 1987)

Synonyms
- Adalaria jannae Millen, 1987; Knoutsodonta jannae (Millen, 1987) superseded combination

= Atalodoris jannae =

Species of gastropod

Atalodoris jannae is a species of sea slug, a dorid nudibranch, a shell-less marine gastropod mollusc in the family Onchidorididae.

It was frequently mis-identified as Onchidoris muricata. K. jannae is the type species of the genus Knoutsodonta.

== Distribution ==
This species was described from Tyee Point, Copper Cove, British Columbia, Canada, (49°22′8″N 123°16′5″W). It is currently known from Prince William Sound, Alaska south to Lion Rock San Luis Obispo County, California. A specimen from Pillar Point, San Mateo County, California was sequenced for the genes 16S, partial 18S, partial 28S, Histone H3, and the DNA barcoding Folmer region of Cox1 and a specimen from Prince William Sound, Alaska was sequenced for 16S and H3 in an investigation which established the genus Knoutsodonta.

== Diet ==
In British Columbia Knoutsodonta jannae is found feeding on Membranipora serrilamella and Membranipora membranacea on blades of large brown algae. In California orange coloured specimens recorded as Adalaria sp. were found feeding intertidally on the orange bryozoan Lyrula hippocrepsis. Lemon yellow specimens were reported to feed on Reginella mucronata.

== See also ==
- Knoutsodonta
- Onchidoris
