= Cotesia ginginensis =

Scientific classification
- Kingdom: Animalia
- Phylum: Arthropoda
- Class: Insecta
- Order: Hymenoptera
- Family: Braconidae
- Genus: Cotesia
- Species: C. ginginensis

Binomial name
- Cotesia ginginensis Fagan-Jeffries & Davies, 2025

Species of wasp

Cotesia ginginensis is a species of parasitoid wasp from Australia. It was discovered in 2022 by a group of students in Queensland, and described in Canada in 2025.

== History ==
In 2022, as part of a citizen science program, students from Gin Gin State High School in Gin Gin, Queensland, collected a female specimen of the then unknown species in a Malaise trap, describing it as "creepy". Another specimen, also female, was collected from Prospect Creek State School in Prospect. These were then sent to the Centre for Biodiversity Genomics in Ontario, Canada, where they were described, and their DNA was barcoded. The species was named by and for the school community in Gin Gin, where the first specimen was found. A male specimen of the species is yet to be found.

== Taxonomy ==
Cotesia ginginensis is different from other species in the Cotesia genus from Australia and Papua New Guinea in that its mesosoma is not flattened. It has a black head, antennae and mesosoma, with the rest of the body being a yellow-dark brown colour. The body length of the specimens collected were 2.7 millimetres (0.106 in), while the length from the head to the apex of the metasoma was 2.8 millimetres (0.110 in).
