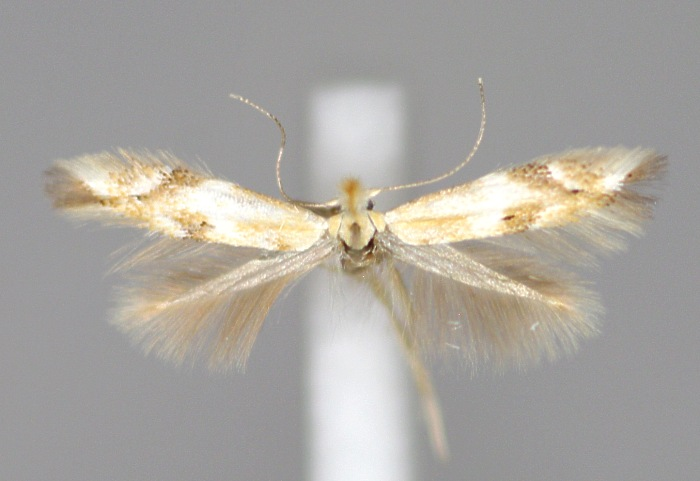

Scientific classification
- Kingdom: Animalia
- Phylum: Arthropoda
- Clade: Pancrustacea
- Class: Insecta
- Order: Lepidoptera
- Family: Bucculatricidae
- Genus: Bucculatrix
- Species: B. noltei

Binomial name
- Bucculatrix noltei Petry, 1912

= Bucculatrix noltei =

Species of moth

Bucculatrix noltei is a moth in the family Bucculatricidae. It is found from Finland to Belgium, Italy and the Crimea and from the Netherlands to Central Russia. It was described by August Arthur Petry in 1912.

The wingspan is 5–6 mm. Adults are on wing from April to May and again from July to August in two generations per year.

The larvae feed on Artemisia vulgaris. They mine the leaves of their host plant. Larvae can be found from June to October. The species overwinters in the pupal stage.
