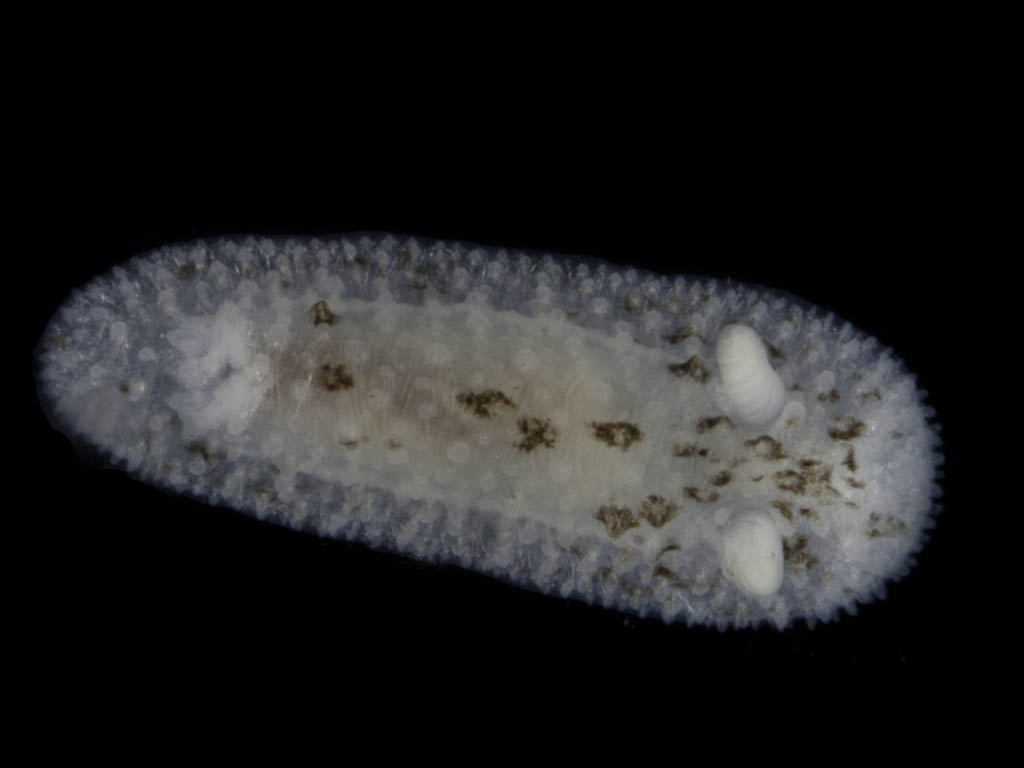
- The nudibranch Atalodoris oblonga, Gulen Dive Resort, Norway.

Scientific classification
- Kingdom: Animalia
- Phylum: Mollusca
- Class: Gastropoda
- Order: Nudibranchia
- Family: Onchidorididae
- Genus: Atalodoris
- Species: A. oblonga

Binomial name
- Atalodoris oblonga (Alder & Hancock, 1845)

Synonyms
- Doris oblonga Alder & Hancock, 1845; Knoutsodonta oblonga (Alder & Hancock, 1845) superseded combination; Onchidoris oblonga (Alder & Hancock, 1845)

= Atalodoris oblonga =

Species of gastropod

Atalodoris oblonga is a species of sea slug, a dorid nudibranch, a shell-less marine gastropod mollusc in the family Onchidorididae.

== Description ==
(Original description) The body is rather convex, oblong-ovate, and tapers towards the rear. The cloak is pale straw-colored, freckled, and spotted with umber-brown. It is densely spiculose and covered with moderate-sized, nearly equal conical papillae.

The tentacles are rather thick and finely laminated, lacking sheaths. The branchial plumes are seven in number, shortish, and do not spread out much. They are surrounded by a circle of large tubercles.

The head has a large veil. The foot is somewhat narrow, straight, and slightly notched in the front, and it does not extend beyond the cloak at the rear.

== Distribution ==
This species was described from Berry Head, Torbay, Devon, England. It is currently known from Norway south to the Atlantic south coast of England.

== See also ==
- Knoutsodonta
- Onchidoris
