= Sattleria pyrenaica =

Scientific classification
- Domain: Eukaryota
- Kingdom: Animalia
- Phylum: Arthropoda
- Class: Insecta
- Order: Lepidoptera
- Family: Gelechiidae
- Genus: Sattleria
- Species: S. pyrenaica

Binomial name
- Sattleria pyrenaica (Petry, 1904)

Synonyms
- Gelechia pyrenaica Petry, 1904

Species of moth

Sattleria pyrenaica is a moth in the family Gelechiidae. It was described by August Arthur Petry in 1904. It is found in the Pyrenees and Basses-Alpes of Spain, Andorra and France.
