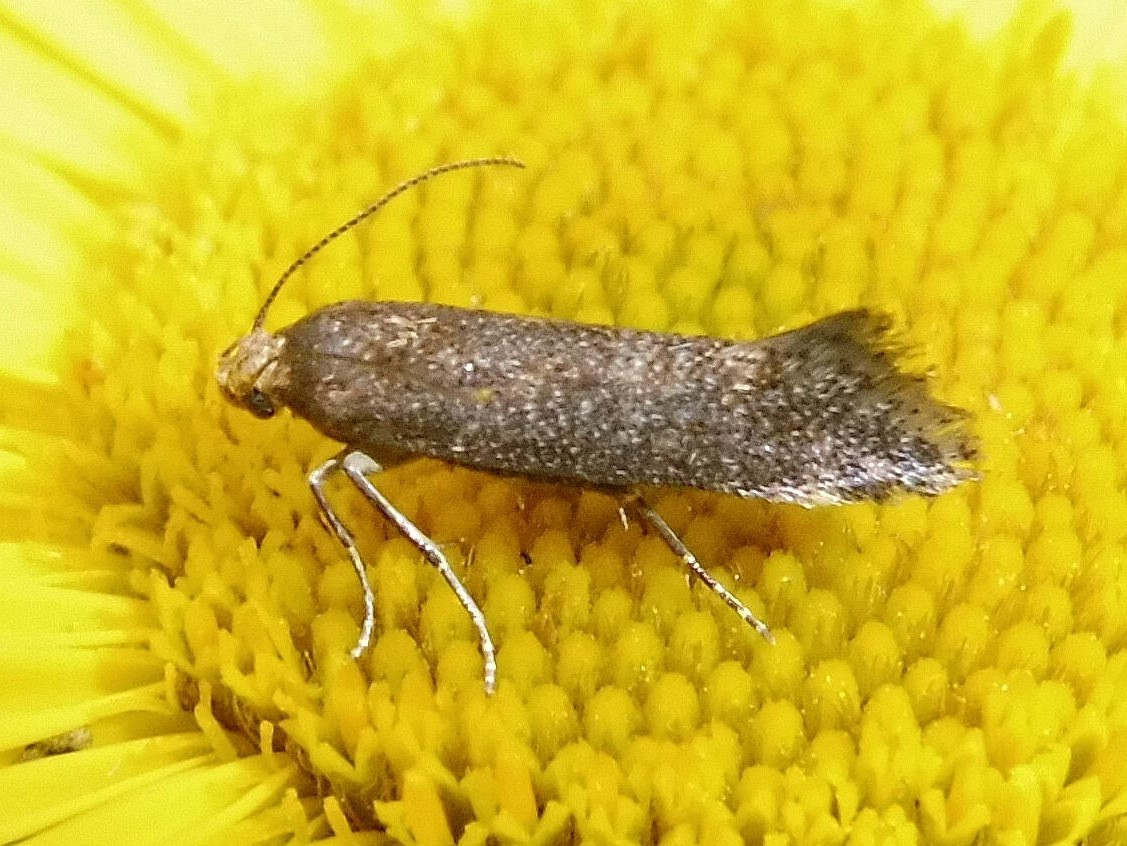

Scientific classification
- Kingdom: Animalia
- Phylum: Arthropoda
- Class: Insecta
- Order: Lepidoptera
- Family: Gelechiidae
- Genus: Apodia
- Species: A. martinii

Binomial name
- Apodia martinii Petry, 1911

= Apodia martinii =

Species of moth

Apodia martinii is a species of moth in the family Gelechiidae. It is found in Germany.
