= Sattleria karsholti =

Scientific classification
- Kingdom: Animalia
- Phylum: Arthropoda
- Clade: Pancrustacea
- Class: Insecta
- Order: Lepidoptera
- Family: Gelechiidae
- Genus: Sattleria
- Species: S. karsholti

Binomial name
- Sattleria karsholti Huemer & Hebert, 2011

Species of moth

Sattleria karsholti is a moth in the family Gelechiidae. It was described by Peter Huemer and Paul D. N. Hebert in 2011. It is found in the southern Alps of Italy, from Monte Baldo in the west to Pizo Arera in the east.

Adults are on wing from the end of June to mid-August.
