= Sattleria cottiella =

Scientific classification
- Kingdom: Animalia
- Phylum: Arthropoda
- Clade: Pancrustacea
- Class: Insecta
- Order: Lepidoptera
- Family: Gelechiidae
- Genus: Sattleria
- Species: S. cottiella

Binomial name
- Sattleria cottiella Huemer & Hebert, 2011

Species of moth

Sattleria cottiella is a moth in the family Gelechiidae. It was described by Peter Huemer and Paul D. N. Hebert in 2011. It is found in the southern Cottian Alps of Italy.
