= Eupithecia abdera =

Scientific classification
- Domain: Eukaryota
- Kingdom: Animalia
- Phylum: Arthropoda
- Class: Insecta
- Order: Lepidoptera
- Family: Geometridae
- Genus: Eupithecia
- Species: E. abdera

Binomial name
- Eupithecia abdera Herbulot, 1987

Species of geometer moth

Eupithecia abdera is a moth in the family Geometridae. It is known from Ecuador, where the holotype, an adult male specimen, was collected at an altitude of 3400 m.

The holotype was DNA sequenced as part of a study involving 3846 geometrid type specimens, and has been included in the Barcode of Life Data System as part of the dataset DS-GEOTYPES.
