= Sattleria graiaeella =

Scientific classification
- Kingdom: Animalia
- Phylum: Arthropoda
- Clade: Pancrustacea
- Class: Insecta
- Order: Lepidoptera
- Family: Gelechiidae
- Genus: Sattleria
- Species: S. graiaeella

Binomial name
- Sattleria graiaeella Huemer & Hebert, 2011

Species of moth

Sattleria graiaeella is a moth in the family Gelechiidae. It was described by Peter Huemer and Paul D. N. Hebert in 2011. It is found in the western Alps of Italy and France.

The wingspan is 16.5–18.5 mm. Adults are on wing from the end of June to mid-August.
