= Barcoding =

The term Barcoding may refer to:

- Barcode
- DNA barcoding
