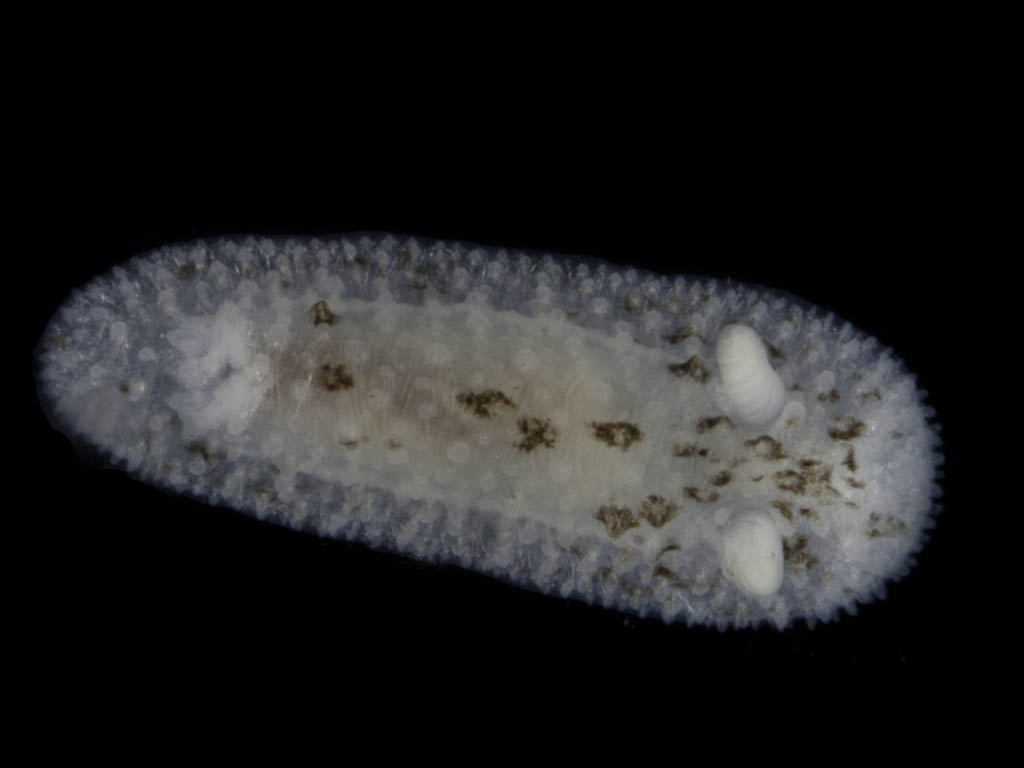
- Atalodoris oblonga

Scientific classification
- Kingdom: Animalia
- Phylum: Mollusca
- Class: Gastropoda
- Order: Nudibranchia
- Infraorder: Doridoidei
- Superfamily: Onchidoridoidea
- Family: Onchidorididae
- Genus: Atalodoris; Iredale & O'Donoghue, 1923

Type species
- Doris pusilla Alder & Hancock, 1845

Synonyms
- Knoutsodonta Hallas & Gosliner, 2015 · unaccepted > junior subjective synonym

= Atalodoris =

Genus of gastropods

Atalodoris is a genus of dorid nudibranchs in the family Onchidorididae.

== Genera ==
- Atalodoris butanito Ortea, 2021
- Atalodoris camassae Furfaro & Trainito, 2022
- Atalodoris inconspicua (Alder & Hancock, 1851)
- Atalodoris jannae (Millen, 1987)
- Atalodoris jannaella (Martynov, N. Sanamyan & Korshunova, 2015)
- Atalodoris oblonga (Alder & Hancock, 1845)
- Atalodoris pictoni (Furfaro & Trainito, 2017)
- Atalodoris pusilla (Alder & Hancock, 1845)
- Atalodoris reticulata (Ortea, 1979)
- Atalodoris sparsa (Alder & Hancock, 1846)

== Synonyms ==
- Atalodoris albonigra (Pruvot-Fol, 1951): synonym of Atalodoris pusilla (Alder & Hancock, 1845) (junior subjective synonym)
- Atalodoris bouvieri (Vayssière, 1919): synonym of Idaliadoris bouvieri (Vayssière, 1919) (superseded combination)
- Atalodoris brasiliensis (Alvim, Padula & Pimenta, 2011): synonym of Idaliadoris brasiliensis (Alvim, Padula & Pimenta, 2011) (superseded combination)
- Atalodoris cervinoi (Ortea & Urgorri, 1979): synonym of Idaliadoris cervinoi (Ortea & Urgorri, 1979) (superseded combination)
- Atalodoris depressa (Alder & Hancock, 1842): synonym of Idaliadoris depressa (Alder & Hancock, 1842) (superseded combination)
- Atalodoris maugeansis (Burn, 1958): synonym of Idaliadoris maugeansis (Burn, 1958) (superseded combination)
- Atalodoris neapolitana (Delle Chiaje, 1841): synonym of Idaliadoris neapolitana (Delle Chiaje, 1841) (superseded combination)
- Atalodoris tridactila (Ortea & Ballesteros, 1982): synonym of Idaliadoris tridactila (Ortea & Ballesteros, 1982) (superseded combination)
