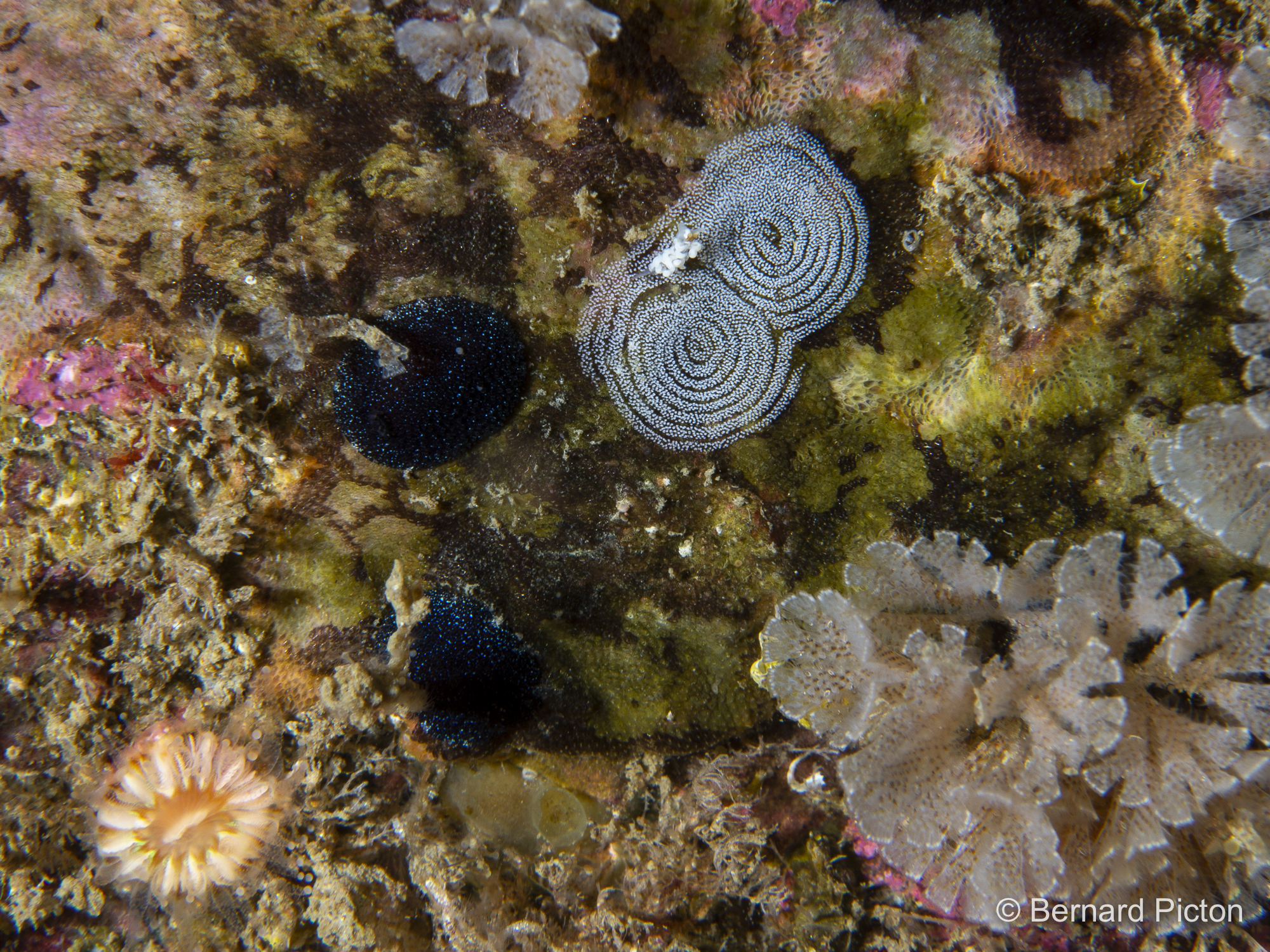
- Inishbofin, Co Galway, Ireland. Two black animals with their spawn coils.

Scientific classification
- Kingdom: Animalia
- Phylum: Mollusca
- Class: Gastropoda
- Order: Nudibranchia
- Family: Onchidorididae
- Genus: Atalodoris
- Species: A. pictoni

Binomial name
- Atalodoris pictoni (Furfaro & Trainito, 2017)

Synonyms
- Knoutsodonta pictoni Furfaro & Trainito, 2017 superseded combination (original combination)

= Atalodoris pictoni =

Species of gastropod

Atalodoris pictoni is a species of sea slug, a dorid nudibranch, a shell-less marine gastropod mollusc in the family Onchidorididae.

== Distribution ==
The type locality of this species is Tavolara-Punta Coda, Cavallo Marine Protected Area, Porto San Paolo, North Eastern Sardinia, Central Tyrrhenian Sea, Mediterranean Sea, Italy, 40.881°N 9.637°E. The original description included specimens from Achill Island, Ireland, Atlantic Ocean and Trieste, North Adriatic Sea, Italy. It is also known from the west coast of Scotland and Spain.

== Diet ==
Atalodoris pictoni feeds on the bryozoan Reptadeonella violacea.

== See also ==
- Knoutsodonta
