= Sattleria styriaca =

Scientific classification
- Kingdom: Animalia
- Phylum: Arthropoda
- Class: Insecta
- Order: Lepidoptera
- Family: Gelechiidae
- Genus: Sattleria
- Species: S. styriaca

Binomial name
- Sattleria styriaca Pitkin & Sattler, 1991

Species of moth

Sattleria styriaca is a moth in the family Gelechiidae. It was described by Pitkin and Sattler in 1991. It is found in the Alps of Austria.

The length of the forewings is 10-10.8 mm for males and about 7.6 mm for females. Adults are on wing from late July to the beginning of August.
