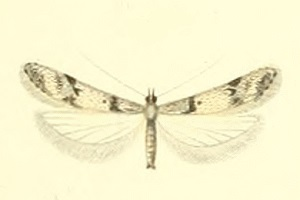

Scientific classification
- Domain: Eukaryota
- Kingdom: Animalia
- Phylum: Arthropoda
- Class: Insecta
- Order: Lepidoptera
- Family: Gelechiidae
- Genus: Sattleria
- Species: S. melaleucella

Binomial name
- Sattleria melaleucella (Constant, 1865)

Synonyms
- Gelechia melaleucella Constant, 1865; Gelechia mariae Frey, 1867; Gelechia dzieduszyckii fusca Burmann, 1954

= Sattleria melaleucella =

Species of moth

Sattleria melaleucella is a moth in the family Gelechiidae. It was described by Constant in 1865. It is found in the Apennines and Alps of France, Germany, Austria, Switzerland and Italy.

The length of the forewings is 7.3-11.6 mm for males and 5.8-8.5 mm for females. Adults are on wing from July to mid-September.
