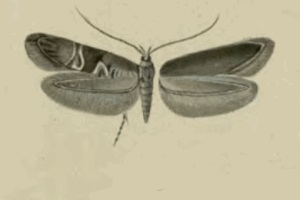
- Sattleria dzieduszyckii

Scientific classification
- Kingdom: Animalia
- Phylum: Arthropoda
- Clade: Pancrustacea
- Class: Insecta
- Order: Lepidoptera
- Family: Gelechiidae
- Subfamily: Gelechiinae
- Genus: Sattleria; Povolný, 1965

= Sattleria =

Genus of moths

Sattleria is a genus of moths in the family Gelechiidae.

== Species ==
- Sattleria angustispina Pitkin & Sattler, 1991
- Sattleria arcuata Pitkin & Sattler, 1991
- Sattleria basistrigella (Huemer, 1997)
- Sattleria breviramus Pitkin & Sattler, 1991
- Sattleria cottiella Huemer & Hebert, 2011
- Sattleria dinarica Huemer, 2014
- Sattleria dolomitica Huemer, 2014
- Sattleria dzieduszyckii (Nowicki, 1864)
- Sattleria graiaeella Huemer & Hebert, 2011
- Sattleria haemusi Huemer, 2014
- Sattleria izoardi Huemer & Sattler, 1992
- Sattleria karsholti Huemer & Hebert, 2011
- Sattleria melaleucella (Constant, 1865)
- Sattleria marguareisi Huemer & Sattler, 1992
- Sattleria pyrenaica (Petry, 1904)
- Sattleria sophiae Timossi, 2014
- Sattleria styriaca Pitkin & Sattler, 1991
- Sattleria triglavica Povolný, 1987
