= Sattleria triglavica =

Scientific classification
- Kingdom: Animalia
- Phylum: Arthropoda
- Clade: Pancrustacea
- Class: Insecta
- Order: Lepidoptera
- Family: Gelechiidae
- Genus: Sattleria
- Species: S. triglavica

Binomial name
- Sattleria triglavica Povolný, 1987

Synonyms
- Sattleria dzieduszyckii triglavica Povolný, 1987

Species of moth

Sattleria triglavica is a moth in the family Gelechiidae. It was described by Povolný in 1987. It is found in Albania, Slovenia and former Yugoslavia.

The length of the forewings is 8.2–10 mm for males and 5.5–7 mm for females. Adults are on wing from July to August.
