= Centre for Biodiversity Genomics =

Research institute at University of Guelph

Coordinates: 43.5285°N 80.2290°W

The Centre for Biodiversity Genomics (CBG) is a non-profit research institute at the University of Guelph in Ontario, Canada. It is led and was developed by Dr. Paul D. N. Hebert. Originally founded in 2007 as the Biodiversity Institute of Ontario, it was re-branded as the Centre for Biodiversity Genomics (CBG) in 2012 following completion of the 50,000 square foot facility's second stage of construction. The CBG conducts research in species identification using DNA barcoding and metabarcoding.

The Centre is recognized for its global role in biodiversity genomics and supports the international research community by providing sequencing and informatics services. It analyzes millions of specimens annually using high-throughput DNA sequencers and mainframe computers to process and interpret genetic data.

The CBG also supports the Barcode of Life Data System (BOLD), which is a cloud-based platform specifically developed for storage and analysis of DNA barcode data, and the Multiplex Barcode Research And Visualization Environment (mBRAVE), which is an analogous platform to support highly multiplexed projects derived from high-throughput sequencing instruments.

The CBG also hosts the secretariat of the International Barcode of Life (iBOL) consortium, which is a not-for-profit alliance involving researchers and organizations from over 40 countries with a mission to inventory the world's species using DNA barcoding.

== History ==
In 2019, the CBG launched the Arctic BIOSCAN project, a $1.8 million initiative funded by Polar Knowledge Canada to catalog Arctic biodiversity using DNA barcoding. The project involved researchers and local community members in collecting and identifying specimens in areas such as Cambridge Bay and Kugluktuk.

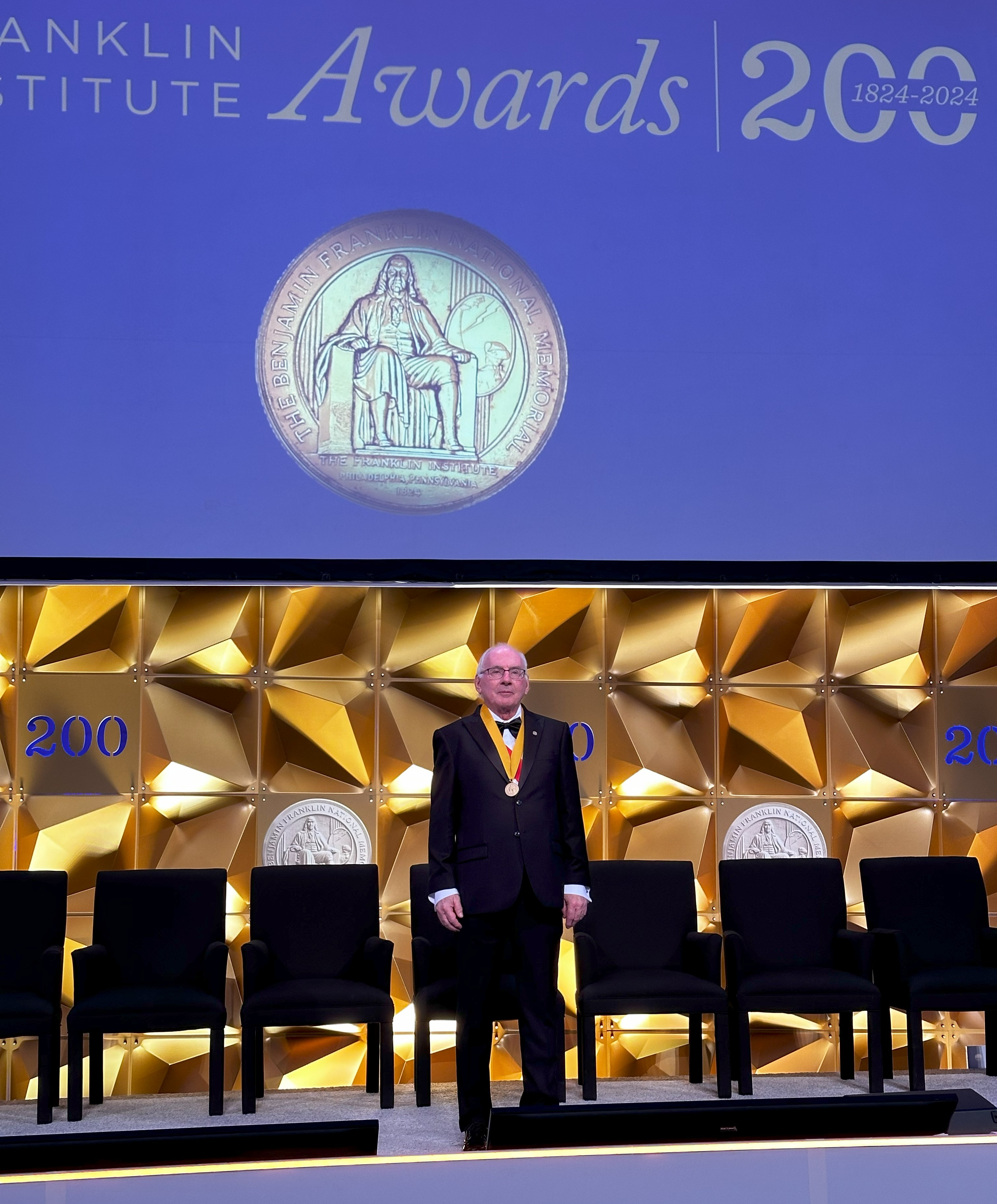
Paul Hebert is shown on the stage of The Franklin Institute, a science museum in Philadelphia, Pennsylvania.

In 2022, the CBG was awarded $8.9 million by the Canada Foundation for Innovation (CFI) through its Major Sciences Initiatives (MSI) program. In total, 19 research centres at 14 institutions across Canada were awarded funding through the MSI program which were showcased in a collection of stories about Canadian research facilities including the CBG. The Canada Foundation for Innovation noted that the CBG maintains a collection of seven million specimens, a corresponding image archive, and what it described as the largest DNA archive dedicated to biodiversity. It also highlighted the Centre's collaboration with the Costa Rican government to catalogue that country's estimated one million species, supporting conservation initiatives and research into natural medicines.

In a 2023 CBC interview, Centre founder Paul Hebert stated that Canada's investment in the CBG had established the world's first core facility for DNA barcoding. He reported that the Centre was leading an international initiative involving researchers from 41 countries and described it as the first large-scale scientific project focused on biodiversity. That same year, CTV News reported that the Centre had collected over eight million specimens from around the world through international agreements. These specimens are stored and catalogued at the facility to support biodiversity monitoring and global research efforts.

In 2024, Paul Hebert, founder and CEO of the CBG, received the Benjamin Franklin Medal in Earth and Environmental Science for his work on DNA barcoding to catalogue global biodiversity. The Benjamin Franklin Medal, awarded by the Franklin Institute, is one of the oldest comprehensive science and technology awards in the United States. Hebert was the fourth Canadian to receive the award.
