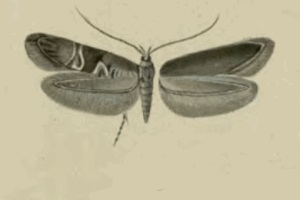

Scientific classification
- Domain: Eukaryota
- Kingdom: Animalia
- Phylum: Arthropoda
- Class: Insecta
- Order: Lepidoptera
- Family: Gelechiidae
- Genus: Sattleria
- Species: S. dzieduszyckii

Binomial name
- Sattleria dzieduszyckii (Nowicki, 1864)

Synonyms
- Gelechia (Anacampsis) dzieduszyckii Nowicki, 1864; Gelechia dzieduszyckii tatrica Gregor & Povolný, 1955

= Sattleria dzieduszyckii =

Species of moth

Sattleria dzieduszyckii is a moth in the family Gelechiidae. It was described by Nowicki in 1864. It is found in the Carpathian Mountains of Poland, Slovakia, Romania and former Yugoslavia.

The length of the forewings is 6.9-8.8 mm for males and 4.9-5.6 mm for females. Adults are on wing from June to mid-August.

The larvae possibly feed on Saxifraga species, Silene acaulis or Cerastium species.
