= Sattleria angustispina =

Scientific classification
- Kingdom: Animalia
- Phylum: Arthropoda
- Class: Insecta
- Order: Lepidoptera
- Family: Gelechiidae
- Genus: Sattleria
- Species: S. angustispina

Binomial name
- Sattleria angustispina Pitkin & Sattler, 1991

Species of moth

Sattleria angustispina is a moth in the family Gelechiidae. It was described by Pitkin and Sattler in 1991. It is found in the Pyrenees of France.

The length of the forewings is 8.1–9 mm for males and 5.3-6.2 mm for females. Adults are on wing from July to August.
