= Sattleria breviramus =

Scientific classification
- Kingdom: Animalia
- Phylum: Arthropoda
- Class: Insecta
- Order: Lepidoptera
- Family: Gelechiidae
- Genus: Sattleria
- Species: S. breviramus

Binomial name
- Sattleria breviramus Pitkin & Sattler, 1991

Species of moth

Sattleria breviramus is a moth in the family Gelechiidae. It was described by Pitkin and Sattler in 1991. It is found in the Alpes Maritimes of France.

The length of the forewings is about 9.1 mm. The forewings lack a distinct dark stripe along the fold. Adults are on wing in July.
