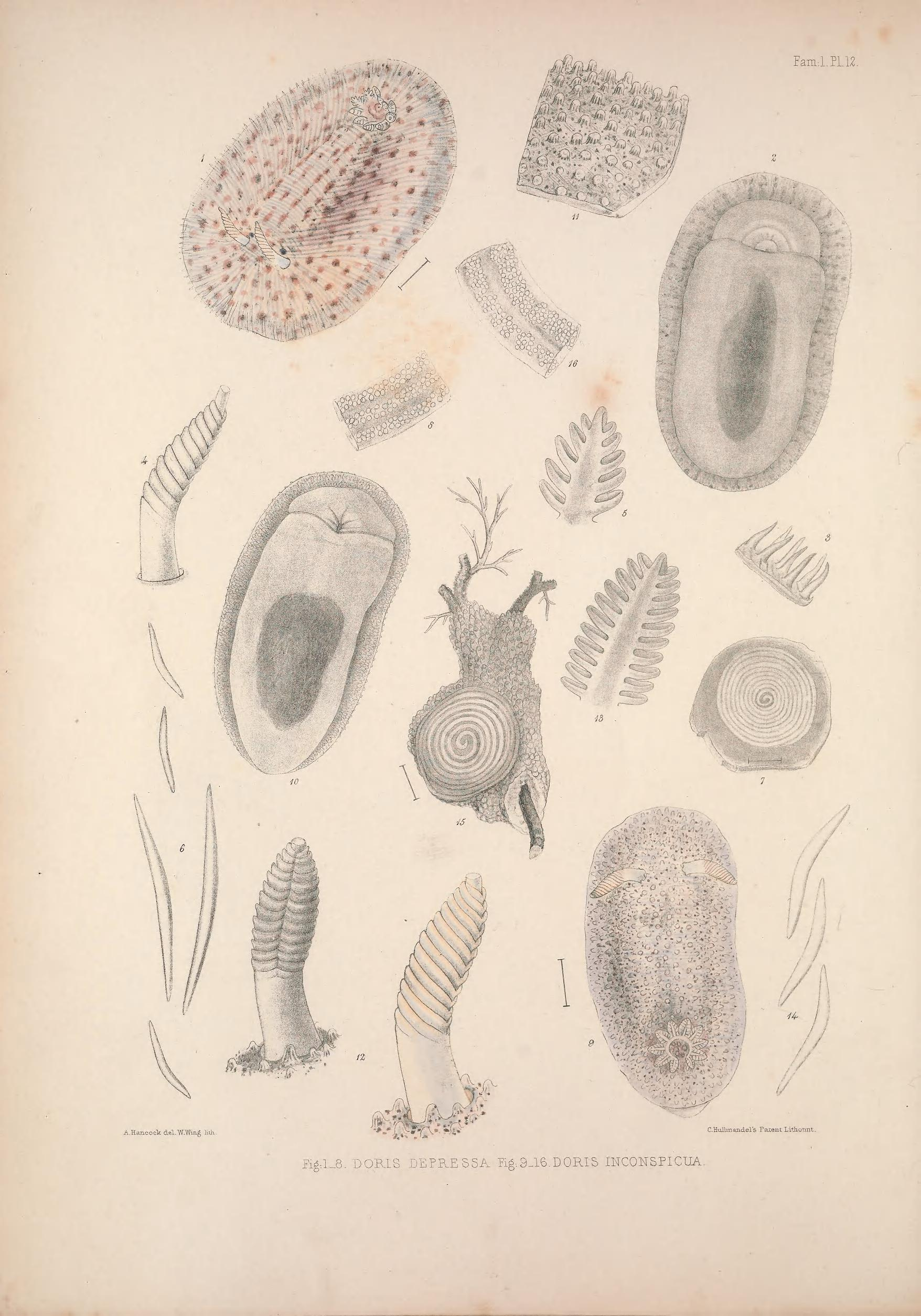
- Plate from original description, fig. 9-16.

Scientific classification
- Kingdom: Animalia
- Phylum: Mollusca
- Class: Gastropoda
- Order: Nudibranchia
- Family: Onchidorididae
- Genus: Atalodoris
- Species: A. inconspicua

Binomial name
- Atalodoris inconspicua (Alder & Hancock, 1851)

Synonyms
- Doris inconspicua Alder & Hancock, 1851; Knoutsodonta inconspicua (Alder & Hancock, 1851) superseded combination; Onchidoris inconspicua (Alder & Hancock, 1851)

= Atalodoris inconspicua =

Species of gastropod

Atalodoris inconspicua is a species of sea slug, a dorid nudibranch, a shell-less marine gastropod mollusc in the family Onchidorididae.

== Description ==
(Original description) The body is a purplish-white with minute brown spots and is not significantly depressed. The cloak is covered with small, obtuse tubercles. The tentacles are subclavate and stout, while the branchial plumes are ten in number, white, and arranged in an open circle.

== Distribution ==
This species was described from Northumberland, England. It is currently known from the European coasts of the North Atlantic Ocean from Norway south to Brittany.
