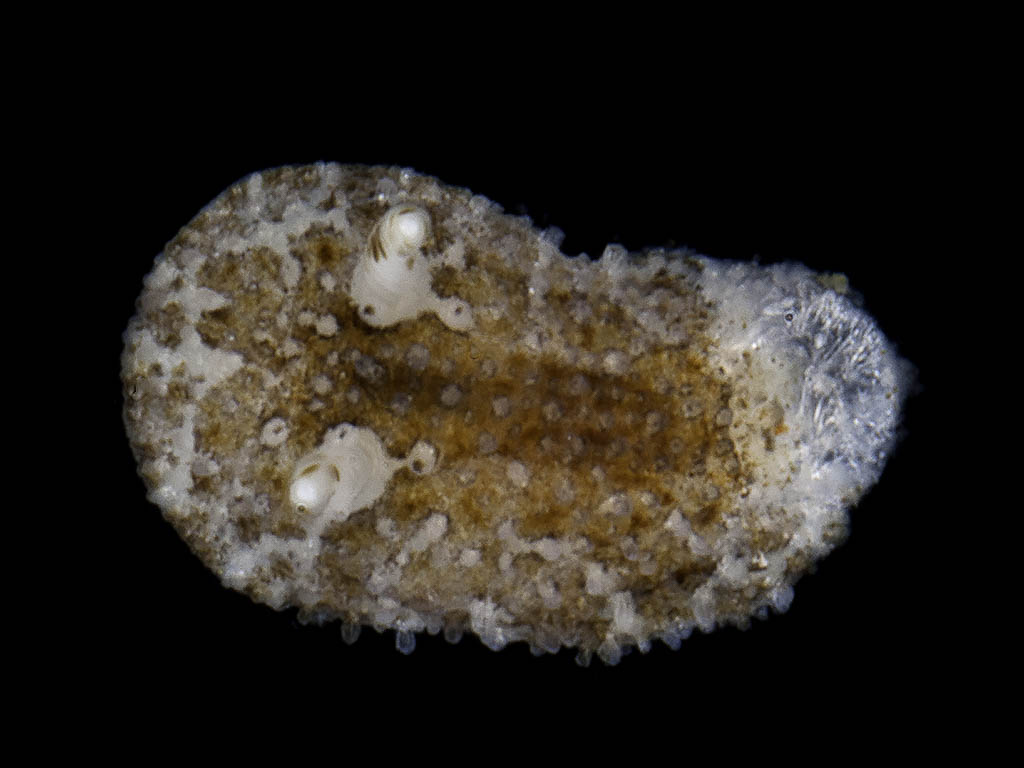
- The nudibranch Atalodoris sparsa, 4 mm length, Gulen Dive Resort, Norway.

Scientific classification
- Kingdom: Animalia
- Phylum: Mollusca
- Class: Gastropoda
- Order: Nudibranchia
- Family: Onchidorididae
- Genus: Atalodoris
- Species: A. sparsa

Binomial name
- Atalodoris sparsa (Alder & Hancock, 1846)

Synonyms
- Doris sparsa Alder & Hancock, 1846; Knoutsodonta sparsa (Alder & Hancock, 1846) superseded combination; Onchidoris sparsa (Alder & Hancock, 1846

= Atalodoris sparsa =

Species of gastropod

Atalodoris sparsa is a species of sea slug, a dorid nudibranch, a shell-less marine gastropod mollusc in the family Onchidorididae.

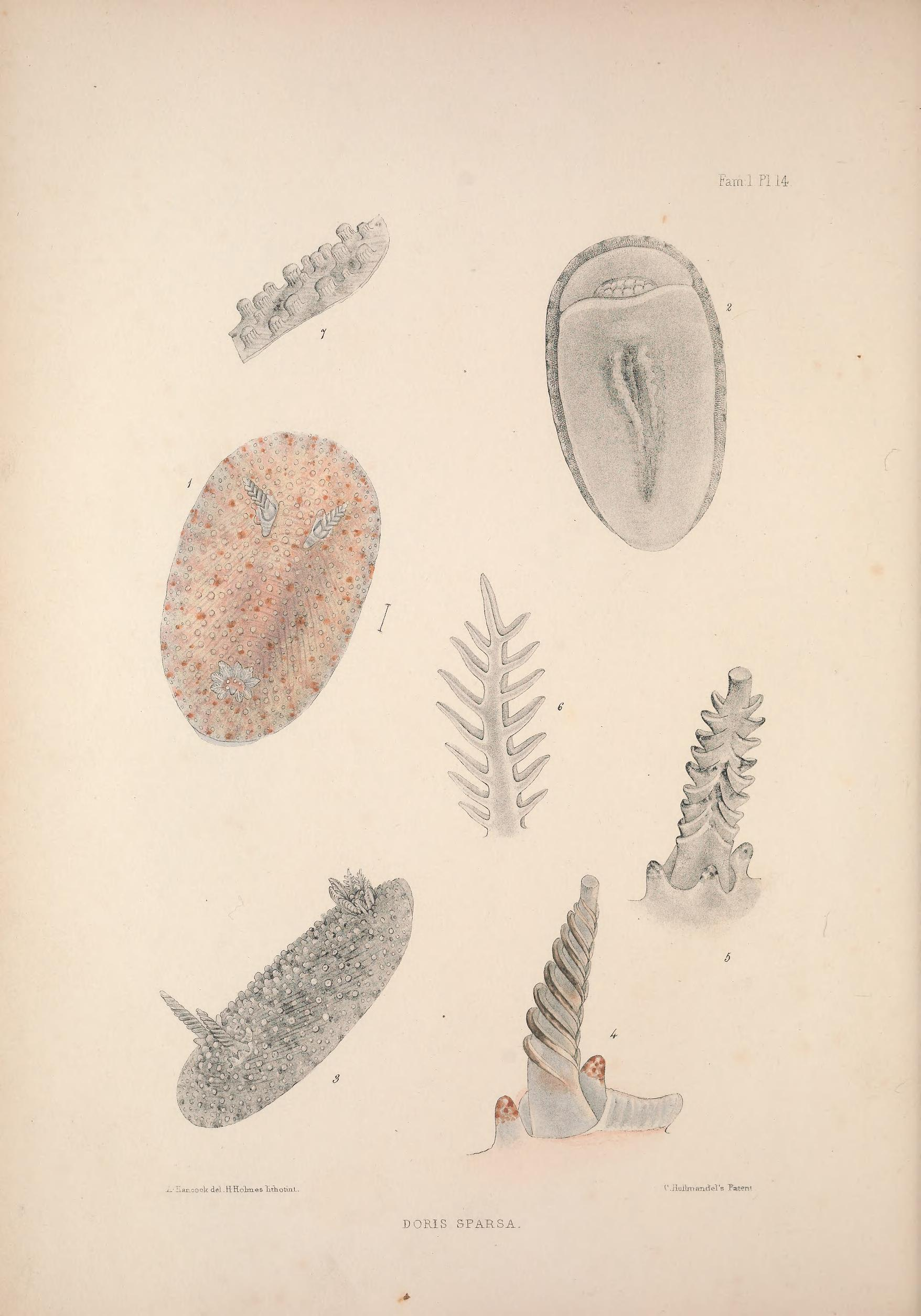
Colour plate from Alder & Hancock Monograph, 1845–55.

== Description ==
(Original description) The body is ovate and notably depressed. The cloak is an obscure pale yellow with a few reddish-brown freckles and distant spiculose tubercles.

The dorsal tentacles are slightly conical with eight or nine broad, distant laminae and are blotched with olive-brown. The margins of their cavities have three or four tubercular points.

The gills are very small and colorless, consisting of nine pinnate plumes arranged in a horseshoe shape. The head has a large, semicircular veil. The foot is nearly as broad as the cloak, colorless, and is slightly bilobed at the front.

== Distribution ==
This species was described from Cullercoats, North Tyneside, England. It is currently known from the European coasts of the North Atlantic Ocean from Norway, Orkney and Sweden south to the northern coast of Spain.

== Diet ==
Atalodoris sparsa feeds on the bryozoan Cellepora pumicosa. It has also been reported to eat Porella concinna.

== See also ==
Knoutsodonta
