= Sattleria marguareisi =

Scientific classification
- Kingdom: Animalia
- Phylum: Arthropoda
- Clade: Pancrustacea
- Class: Insecta
- Order: Lepidoptera
- Family: Gelechiidae
- Genus: Sattleria
- Species: S. marguareisi

Binomial name
- Sattleria marguareisi Huemer & Sattler, 1992

Species of moth

Sattleria marguareisi is a moth in the family Gelechiidae. It was described by Peter Huemer and Klaus Siegfried Oskar Sattler in 1992. It is found in the Alpes-Maritimes of France.
