= Sattleria arcuata =

Scientific classification
- Kingdom: Animalia
- Phylum: Arthropoda
- Class: Insecta
- Order: Lepidoptera
- Family: Gelechiidae
- Genus: Sattleria
- Species: S. arcuata

Binomial name
- Sattleria arcuata Pitkin & Sattler, 1991

Species of moth

Sattleria arcuata is a moth in the family Gelechiidae. It was described by Pitkin and Sattler in 1991. It is found in the Pyrenees of France and Spain.

The length of the forewings is 7.7–11 mm for males and 5.5-6.8 mm for females. Adults are on wing from July to August.
