= Sattleria basistrigella =

Scientific classification
- Kingdom: Animalia
- Phylum: Arthropoda
- Clade: Pancrustacea
- Class: Insecta
- Order: Lepidoptera
- Family: Gelechiidae
- Genus: Sattleria
- Species: S. basistrigella

Binomial name
- Sattleria basistrigella (Huemer, 1997)

Synonyms
- Gelechia dzieduszykii f. basistrigella Müller-Rutz, 1934; Sattleria triglavica basistrigella Huemer, 1997; Sattleria triglavica basistrigella

Species of moth

Sattleria basistrigella is a moth in the family Gelechiidae. It was described by Peter Huemer in 1997. It is found in the Alps of Italy and Switzerland.

The length of the forewings is 8.2–10 mm for males and 5.5–7 mm for females. Adults are on wing from July to August. The larvae feed on Silene acaulis. They live in a silken tube on the host plant.
