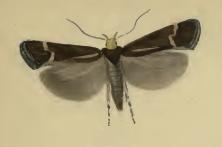

Scientific classification
- Kingdom: Animalia
- Phylum: Arthropoda
- Clade: Pancrustacea
- Class: Insecta
- Order: Lepidoptera
- Family: Gelechiidae
- Subfamily: Anomologinae
- Genus: Apodia; Heinemann, 1870

= Apodia =

Genus of moths

Apodia is a genus of moth in the family Gelechiidae.

== Species ==
- Apodia bifractella (Duponchel, 1843)
- Apodia martinii Petry, 1911
