= Sattleria dinarica =

Scientific classification
- Kingdom: Animalia
- Phylum: Arthropoda
- Clade: Pancrustacea
- Class: Insecta
- Order: Lepidoptera
- Family: Gelechiidae
- Genus: Sattleria
- Species: S. dinarica

Binomial name
- Sattleria dinarica Huemer, 2014

Species of moth

Sattleria dinarica is a moth in the family Gelechiidae. It was described by Peter Huemer in 2014. It is found in the Dinaric Alps of Montenegro.
