= Sattleria dolomitica =

Scientific classification
- Kingdom: Animalia
- Phylum: Arthropoda
- Clade: Pancrustacea
- Class: Insecta
- Order: Lepidoptera
- Family: Gelechiidae
- Genus: Sattleria
- Species: S. dolomitica

Binomial name
- Sattleria dolomitica Huemer, 2014

Species of moth

Sattleria dolomitica is a moth in the family Gelechiidae. It was described by Peter Huemer in 2014. It is found in the eastern Dolomites of Italy.
