= Pollen DNA barcoding =

Process of identifying pollen donor plant species

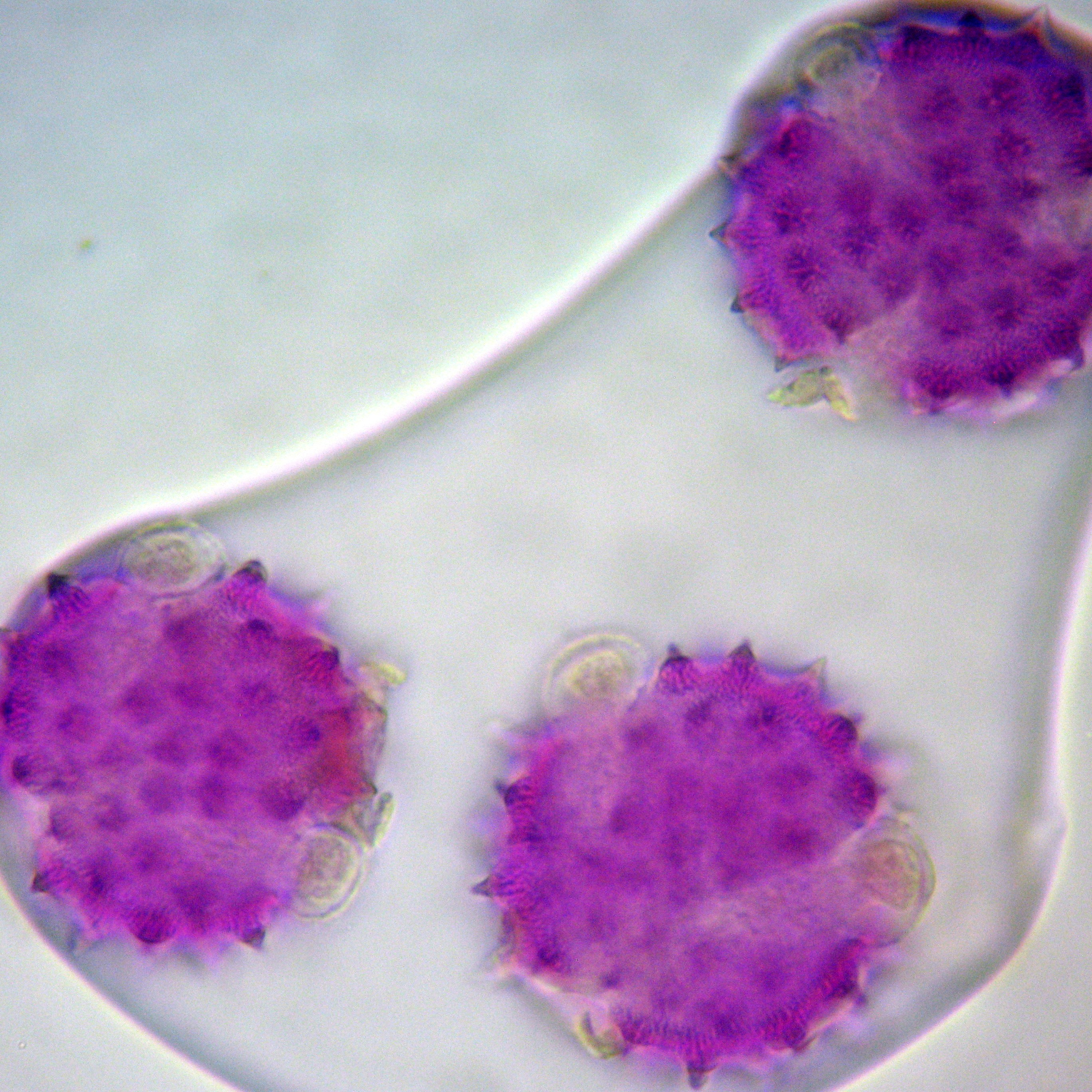
Microscopic image of Ligularia pollen

Pollen DNA barcoding is the process of identifying pollen donor plant species through the amplification and sequencing of specific, conserved regions of plant DNA. Being able to accurately identify pollen has a wide range of applications though it has been difficult in the past due to the limitations of microscopic identification of pollen.

Pollen identified using DNA barcoding involves the specific targeting of gene regions that are found in most to all plant species but have high variation between members of different species. The unique sequence of base pairs for each species within these target regions can be used as an identifying feature.

The applications of pollen DNA barcoding range from forensics, to food safety, to conservation. Each of these fields benefits from the creation of plant barcode reference libraries. These libraries range largely in size and scope of their collections as well as what target region(s) they specialize in.

One of the main challenges of identifying pollen is that it is often collected as a mixture of pollen from several species. Metabarcoding is the process of identifying the individual species DNA from a mixed DNA sample and is commonly used to catalog pollen in mixed pollen loads found on pollinating animals and in environmental DNA (also called eDNA) which is DNA extracted straight from the environment such as in soil or water samples.

== Advantages ==
Some of the principle constraints of microscopic identification are the expertise and time requirements. Identifying pollen via microscopy requires a high level of expertise in the pollen characteristics of the specific plants being studied. With expertise it can still be extremely difficult to identify pollen accurately with high taxonomic resolution. The skills required to do DNA barcoding are much more common making the approach easier to adopt. Pollen DNA barcoding is a technique that has grown in popularity due to the decreased costs associated with "next generation sequencing" (NGS) techniques and is being continually improved in efficiency including through the use of a dual-indexing approach. Some of the other major advantages include the savings in time and resources compared to microscopic identification. Identifying pollen is time-consuming, involving spreading pollen on a slide, staining the pollen to improve visibility, then focusing in on individual pollen grains and identifying them based on size, shape, as well as the shape and number of pores. If a pollen reference library is not available, then pollen has to be collected from wild specimens or from herbarium specimens and is then added to a pollen reference library.

Rare plants visited by some pollinators can be difficult to determine, by using pollen DNA barcoding researchers can uncover "invisible" interactions between plants and pollinators.

== Challenges ==
There are many challenges when it comes to genetic barcoding of pollen. The amplification process of DNA can mean that even small pieces of plant DNA can be detected included those from contaminants to a sample. Strict procedures to prevent contamination are important and can be facilitated by the hardiness of the pollen coat allowing the pollen to be washed of contaminants without damaging the internal pollen DNA.

DNA barcode reference libraries are still being built and standardized target regions are being gradually adopted. These challenges are likely due to the newness of DNA barcoding and will likely improve with the wider adoption of DNA barcoding as a tool used by taxonomists.

Determining the amount of each contributor to a mixed pollen load can be difficult to determine through the use of DNA barcoding. However, scientists have been able to compare pollen amounts via rank order.

=== Alternatives ===
Innovations in automated microscopy and imagining software offer one potential alternative in the identification of pollen. Through the use of pattern-recognition software, researchers have developed software that can characterize microscopic pollen images based on texture analyzes.

== Target regions ==
There have been several different regions of plant DNA that have been used as targets for genetic barcoding including rbcL, matK, trnH-psbA, ITS1 and ITS2. A combination of rbcL and matK has been recommended for use in plant DNA barcoding. It has been found that trnL is better for degraded DNA and ITS1 is better for differentiating species within a genus.

== Applications ==
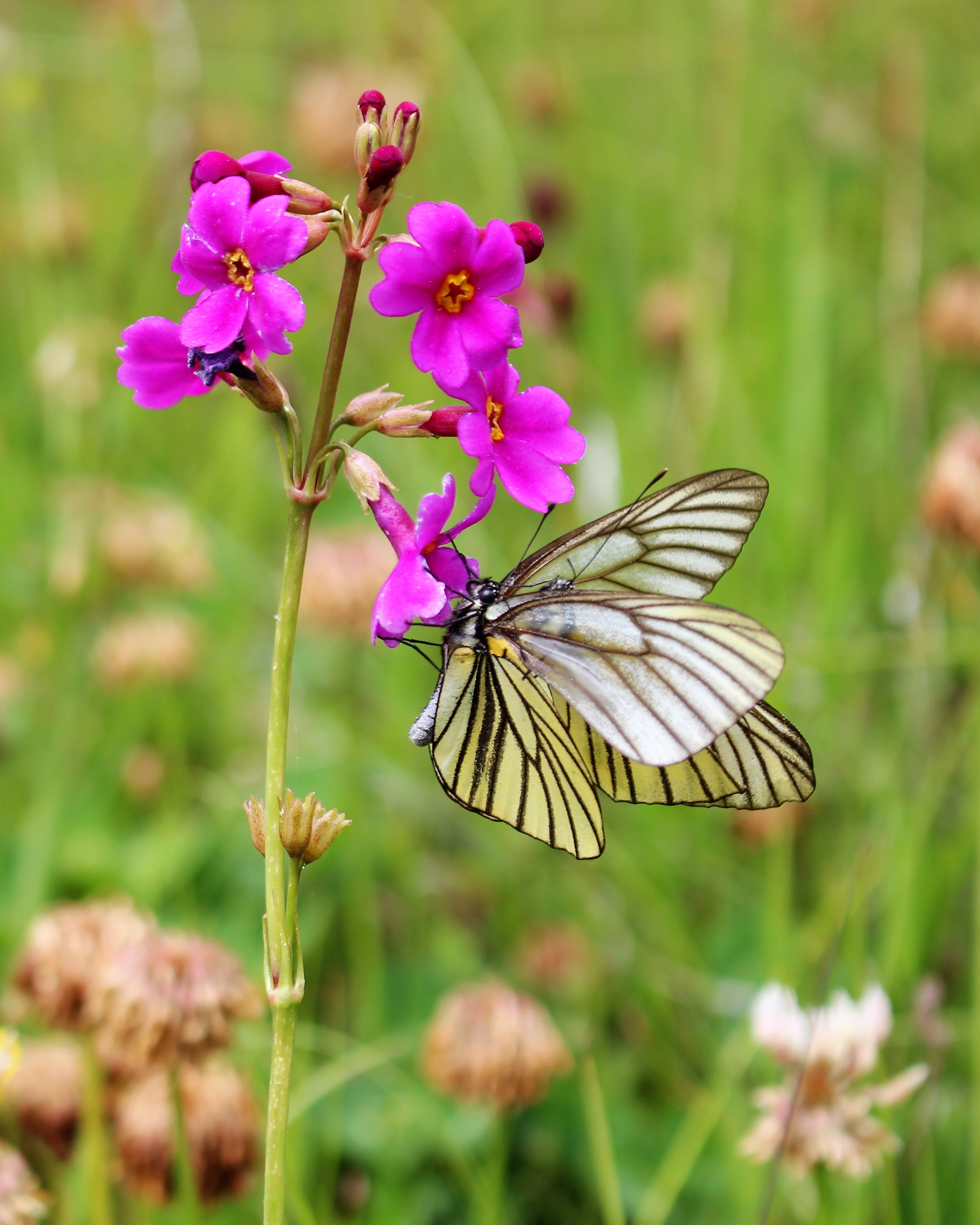
Butterfly foraging for nectar from a flower in the Chinese Himalayas

=== Use in pollination networks ===
Being able to identify pollen is especially important in the study of pollination networks which are made up of all the interactions between plants and the animals that facilitate their pollination. Identifying the pollen carried on insects helps scientists understand what plants are being visited by which insects. Insects can also have homologous features making them difficult to identify and are themselves sometimes identified through genetic barcoding (usually of the CO1 region). Every insect that visits a flower is not necessarily a pollinator. Many lack features such as hairs allowing them to carry pollen while others avoid the pollen-laden anthers to steal nectar. Pollination networks are made more accurate by including what pollen is being carried by which insects. Some scientists argue that pollination effectiveness (PE), which is measured by studying the germination rates of seeds produced from flowers visited only once by a single animal, is the best way to determine which animals are important pollinators though other scientists have used DNA barcoding to determine the genetic origin of pollen found on insects and have argued that this in conjunction with other traits is a good indication of pollination effectiveness. By studying the composition and structure of pollination networks, conservationists can understand the stability of a pollination network and identify which species are most important and which are at most risk to perturbation leading to pollinator declines.

Another advantage of pollen DNA barcoding is that it can be used to determine the source of pollen found on museum specimens of insects, and these records of insect-plant interactions can then be compared to modern-day interactions to see how pollination networks have changed over time due to global warming, land use change, and other factors.

=== Forensics ===
Being accurately able to identify pollen found on evidence helps forensic investigators identify which regions evidence originated from based on the plants that are endemic to those regions. In addition to this, atmospheric pollen originating from illegal cannabis farms were successfully detected by scientists which in the future could allow law enforcement officials to narrow down the search areas for illegal farms.

=== Ancient pollen ===
Due to the hardy structure of pollen which has evolved to survive being transported sometimes great distances while keeping the internal genetic information intact, the origin of pollen found mixed in ancient substrates can often be determined through DNA barcoding.

=== Food safety ===
Honeybees carry pollen as well as the nectar used in their production of honey. For food quality and safety concerns it is important to understand the plant providence of human-consumed bee products including honey, royal jelly, and pollen pellets. Investigators can test which plants honeybees foraged on and thus the origin of the nectar used in honey by collecting pollen packets from honeybees' corbicular loads and identify the pollen via DNA metabarcoding.

== See also ==
- Aeroplankton
