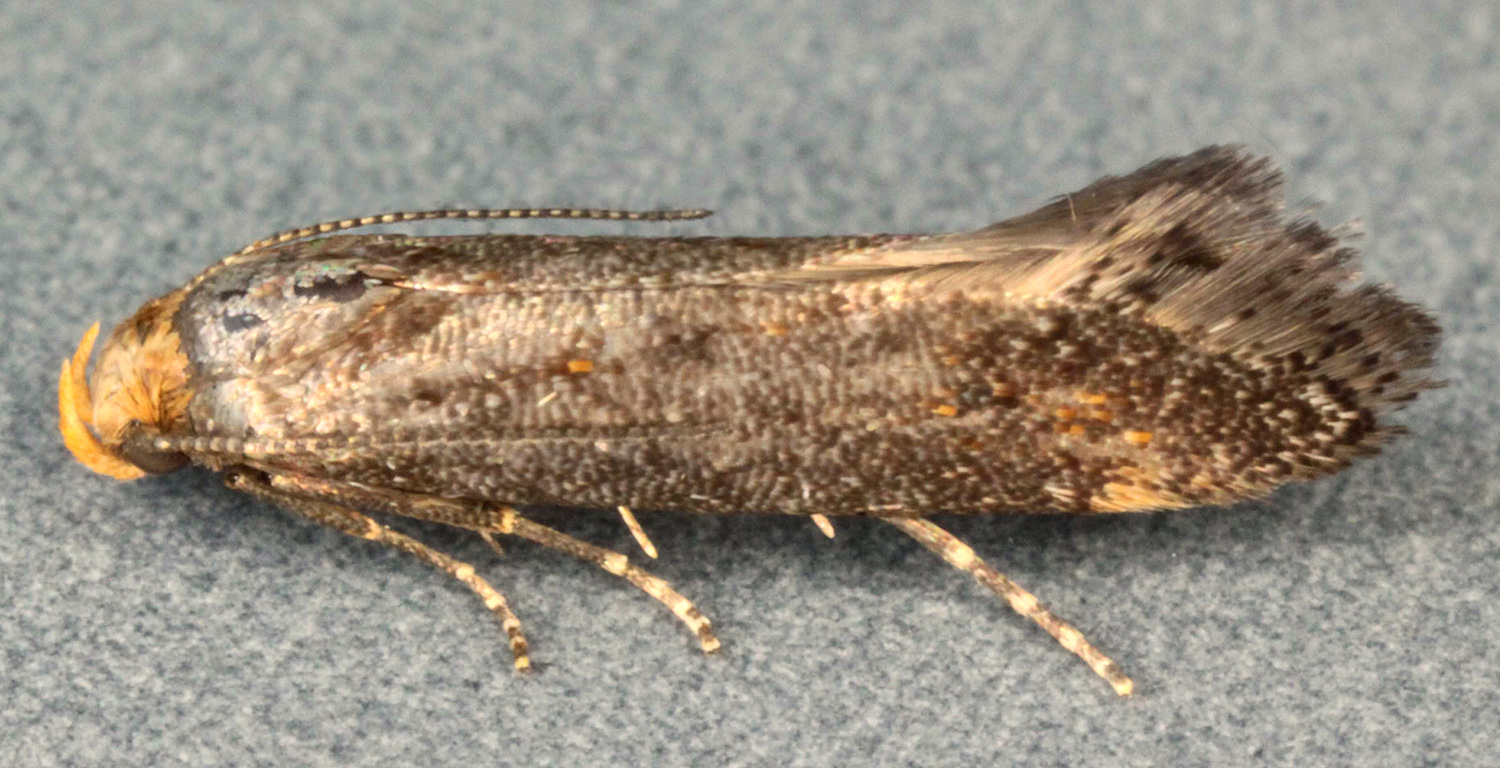

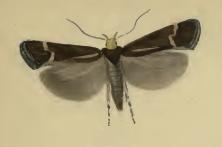

Scientific classification
- Domain: Eukaryota
- Kingdom: Animalia
- Phylum: Arthropoda
- Class: Insecta
- Order: Lepidoptera
- Family: Gelechiidae
- Genus: Apodia
- Species: A. bifractella

Binomial name
- Apodia bifractella (Duponchel, 1843)

Synonyms
- Lita bifractella Duponchel, 1843

= Apodia bifractella =

Species of moth

Apodia bifractella is a moth of the family Gelechiidae. It is found in most of Europe, as well as Turkey, the Caucasus and North Africa.

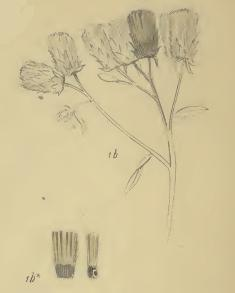
A sprig of Inula conyza (1b), and seeds fastened together and bored by the larva (1b*)

Larva

The wingspan is 9–12 mm. The head and palpi are orange, the face sometimes whitish. The forewings are dark fuscous, sprinkled with grey-whitish, dorsally more or less mixed with ferruginous orange usually with a more distinct small tornal orange mark and an ill-defined ochreous-whitish or pale orange costal spot beyond it, sometimes finely connected . Veins 7 and 8 arise out of vein 6. The hindwings are grey. Larva almost apodal, stout, whitish.

Adults are on wing from July to August.

The larvae feed on Pulicaria dysenterica, Inula conyzae and Aster tripolium.
