= Sattleria izoardi =

Scientific classification
- Kingdom: Animalia
- Phylum: Arthropoda
- Clade: Pancrustacea
- Class: Insecta
- Order: Lepidoptera
- Family: Gelechiidae
- Genus: Sattleria
- Species: S. izoardi

Binomial name
- Sattleria izoardi Huemer & Sattler, 1992

Species of moth

Sattleria izoardi is a moth in the family Gelechiidae. It was described by Peter Huemer and Klaus Siegfried Oskar Sattler in 1992. It is found in the Hautes-Alpes of France and in Italy.

Adults are on wing from late July to late August.
