= Sattleria sophiae =

Scientific classification
- Domain: Eukaryota
- Kingdom: Animalia
- Phylum: Arthropoda
- Class: Insecta
- Order: Lepidoptera
- Family: Gelechiidae
- Genus: Sattleria
- Species: S. sophiae

Binomial name
- Sattleria sophiae Timossi, 2014

Species of moth

Sattleria sophiae is a moth in the family Gelechiidae. It was described by Timossi in 2014. It is found in the Dolomites of Italy.
