= Atalodoris reticulata =

Scientific classification
- Kingdom: Animalia
- Phylum: Mollusca
- Class: Gastropoda
- Order: Nudibranchia
- Family: Onchidorididae
- Genus: Atalodoris
- Species: A. reticulata

Binomial name
- Atalodoris reticulata (Ortea, 1979)

Synonyms
- Knoutsodonta reticulata (Ortea, 1979) superseded combination; Onchidoris reticulata Ortea, 1979

Species of gastropod

Atalodoris reticulata is a species of sea slug, a dorid nudibranch, a shell-less marine gastropod mollusc in the family Onchidorididae.

== Distribution ==
This species was described from Playa de Artedo, Concha de Artedo, (43.56768°N 6.19105°W), Asturias on the North Atlantic Ocean coast of Spain.

== Description ==
Atalodoris reticulata has a translucent white body with brown-green surface pigment which is more intense towards the centre and clearer towards the edges. The area around the rhinophores is white or translucent with two longitudinal bands running backwards towards the gills. Thinner un-pigmented lines join the bases of the tubercles giving a reticulate pattern. Near the edge the pigmentation is reduced to a few widely spaced black scores.

== See also ==
Knoutsodonta
