= Idaliadoris tridactila =

Scientific classification
- Kingdom: Animalia
- Phylum: Mollusca
- Class: Gastropoda
- Order: Nudibranchia
- Family: Onchidorididae
- Genus: Idaliadoris
- Species: I. tridactila

Binomial name
- Idaliadoris tridactila (Ortea & Ballesteros, 1982)

Synonyms
- Atalodoris tridactila (Ortea & Ballesteros, 1982) superseded combination; Knoutsodonta tridactila (Ortea & Ballesteros, 1982) superseded combination; Onchidoris tridactila Ortea & Ballesteros, 1982

Species of gastropod

Idaliadoris tridactila is a species of sea slug, a dorid nudibranch, a shell-less marine gastropod mollusc in the family Onchidorididae.

== Distribution ==
This species was described from Verdicio, Asturias, on the Atlantic Ocean coast of Spain, 43°35′N 005°50′W. Additional specimens were found nearby at El Puntal, 43°30′N 005°14′W.

== Description ==
Idaliadoris tridactila is similar in appearance to Knoutsodonta depressa but is distinguished by having a rhinophore sheath with three elongate tubercles, similar to the ones which cover the dorsal surface of the mantle.

== Diet ==
This species was found on the bryozoan Schizomavella linearis which is a food also reported for Knoutsodonta depressa.

== See also ==
Knoutsodonta
