= Knoutsodonta =

Scientific classification
- Kingdom: Animalia
- Phylum: Mollusca
- Class: Gastropoda
- Order: Nudibranchia
- Infraorder: Doridoidei
- Superfamily: Onchidoridoidea
- Family: Onchidorididae
- Genus: Knoutsodonta; Hallas & Gosliner, 2015

Type species
- Adalaria jannae Millen, 1987

Genus of gastropods

Knoutsodonta is a genus of dorid nudibranchs in the family Onchidorididae. The radular teeth are an unusual shape and a molecular phylogeny study showed that they are not closely related to some other species of Onchidoris within which genus they were formerly placed.

== Species ==
Species within the genus Knoutsodonta include:

- Knoutsodonta albonigra (Pruvot-Fol, 1951)
- Knoutsodonta bouvieri (Vayssière, 1919)
- Knoutsodonta brasiliensis (Alvim, Padula & Pimenta, 2011)
- Knoutsodonta cervinoi (Ortea & Urgorri, 1979)
- Knoutsodonta depressa (Alder & Hancock, 1842)
- Knoutsodonta inconspicua (Alder & Hancock, 1851)
- Knoutsodonta jannae (Millen, 1987) - type species
- Knoutsodonta jannaella (Martynov, N. Sanamyan & Korshunova, 2015)
- Knoutsodonta maugeansis (Burn, 1958)
- Knoutsodonta neapolitana (Delle Chiaje, 1841)
- Knoutsodonta oblonga (Alder & Hancock, 1845)
- Knoutsodonta pictoni Furfaro & Trainito, 2017
- Knoutsodonta pusilla (Alder & Hancock, 1845)
- Knoutsodonta reticulata (Ortea, 1979)
- Knoutsodonta sparsa (Alder & Hancock, 1846)
- Knoutsodonta tridactila (Ortea & Ballesteros, 1982)
