= Paul D. N. Hebert =

Canadian biologist

Paul D.N. Hebert OC FRSC
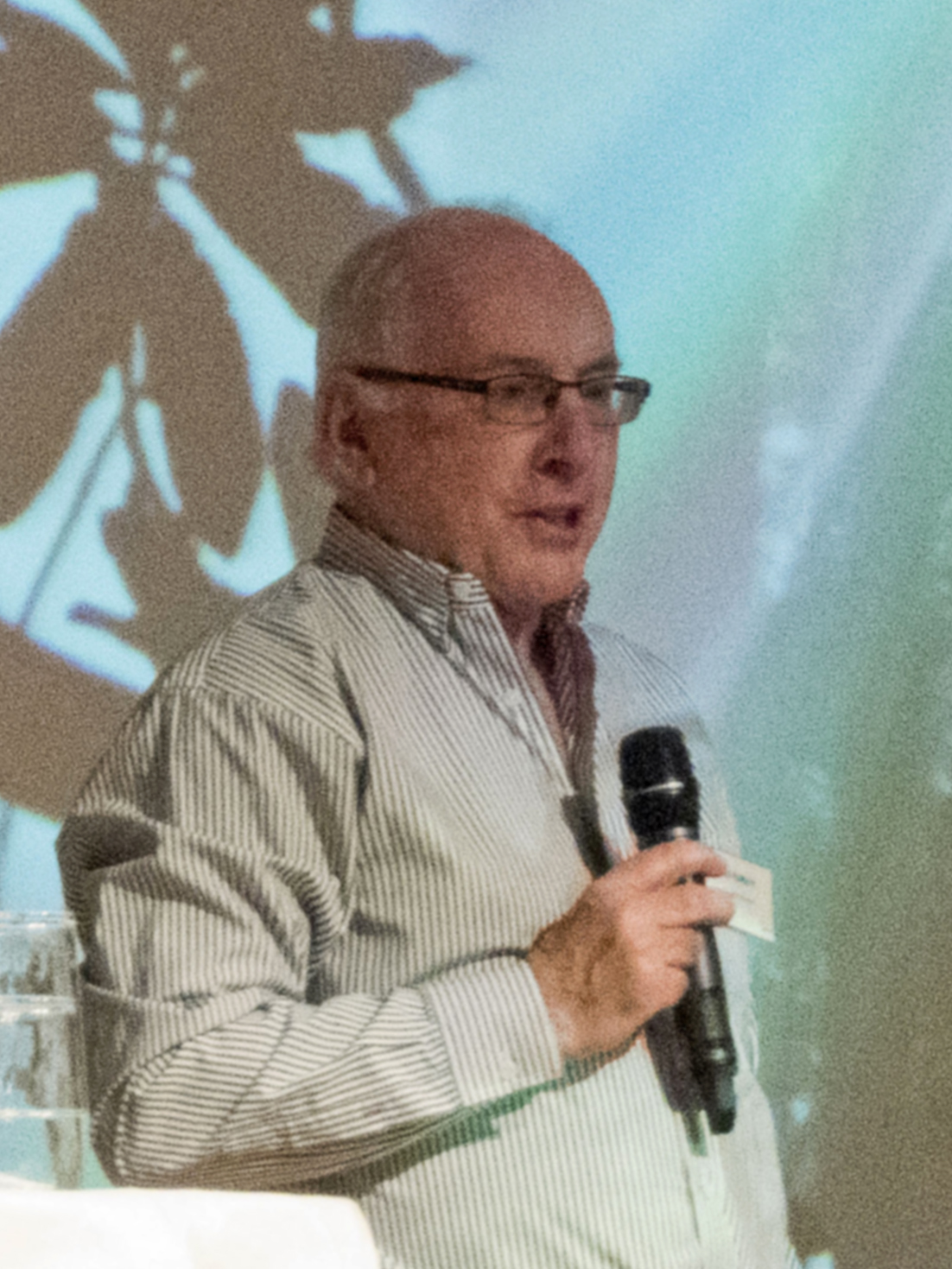
- Hebert at the NorBol symposium in Trondheim, Norway, in 2019
- Born: Paul David Neil Hebert; 1947 (age 78–79); Kingston, Ontario, Canada
- Awards: Heineken Prize (2018) Benjamin Franklin Award (2024)

Academic background
- Education: Queen's University; University of Cambridge
- Doctoral advisor: John Gibson

Academic work
- Discipline: Biology
- Sub-discipline: Genetics
- Institutions: University of Windsor; University of Guelph
- Doctoral students: Melania Cristescu; T. Ryan Gregory
- Notable ideas: DNA barcoding

Paul David Neil Hebert OC FRSC (born 1947) is a Canadian biologist. He is founder and director of the Centre for Biodiversity Genomics at the University of Guelph in Ontario, Canada. He applied the technique invented by Carl Woese and colleagues in the 1980s to arthropods and called it DNA barcoding.

Hebert holds the Tier 1 Canada Research Chair in molecular biodiversity at the University of Guelph where he is a tenured professor in the Department of Integrative Biology. He is an Officer of the Order of Canada, a fellow of the Royal Society of Canada, and received the 2018 Heineken Prize for environmental sciences, and the 2020 MIDORI Prize for Biodiversity.

In 2021, he was awarded the honorary degree of Doctor Honoris Causa at the Norwegian University of Science and Technology (NTNU). Hebert also holds honorary degrees from Western University, University of Windsor and University of Waterloo in Canada.

In 2025, he received the Sustainability Award, presented by the Nobel Sustainability Trust (NST) in cooperation with the Technical University of Munich (TUM), for outstanding research and development in the field of biodiversity. He developed DNA barcoding, a method to rapidly identify species, which is vital for global conservation efforts.
