= August Arthur Petry =

German botanist and entomologist (1858–1932)

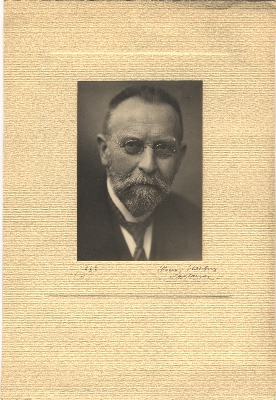
August Petry

August Arthur Petry (1858, Tilleda - 1932 Nordhausen) was a German botanist and entomologist specialising in Microlepidoptera. He was a teacher of philology at the Gymnasium in Nordhausen. August Petry was a Member of the Stettin Entomological Society. Ottmar Hofmann honoured his name in Caryocolum petryi. His collections are, in part, held by the Natural History Museum of Erfurt.

== Works ==
- Petry, A., (1889) Die Vegetationsverhältnisse des Kyffhäuser Gebirges Halle a.S. Tausch & Grosse 1889 (Dissertation: Zugl.: Halle-Wittenberg, Univ., Diss., 1889)
- Petry, A., (1904) Beschreibung neuer Microlepidopteren aus Korsika. Entomologische Zeitung, Stettin 65(): 242–254.
- Petry, A. (1904) Zur Naturgeschichte der Lita nitentella Fuchs Entomologische Zeitung Stettin 65: 176 - 179.
- Petry, A. (1912) Ueber die deutschen an Artemisia lebenden Arten der Gattung Bucculatrix Z. nebst Beschreibung einer neuen Art. Deutsche entomologische Zeitschrift Iris 26 (2): 111-115. Dresden
- Beiträge zur Fauna Thüringens Erfurt; Krefeld Goecke (1936). 2 Microlepidoptera, Kleinschmetterlinge. with Curt Beer, Ernst Hockemeyera and Otto Rapp
- Petry, A. (1936) Beitrag zur Schmetterlingsfauna des Harzes Erfurt, Zu erhalten durch den Bearbeiter with Otto Rapp

The standard author abbreviation Petry is used to indicate this person as the author when citing a botanical name.
