= Plot sampling =

In ecology, plot sampling is a widely used method of abundance estimation in which specific areas, or plots, are selected from within a survey region and sampled. This approach allows scientists to make population estimates using statistical techniques such as the Horvitz–Thompson estimator. Plot sampling is generally effective when it can be assumed that each survey will identify all of the animals in the sampled area, and that the animals will be distributed uniformly and independently.

Many types of sampling fall under the plot sampling category including quadrant sampling, strip sampling, and many others. Each considers abundance from a statistical standpoint, and only differs in the shape and size of the plot itself. Plot sampling through area-based counts can also estimate the relative abundance of mobile organisms, like large mammals observed during aerial surveys. However, additional information, like detection probability, may be necessary to estimate absolute population sizes for mobile organisms.

Area-based counts often utilize quadrants, which are sampling areas or volumes of any size or shape. For example, a quadrat could be a 0.25 × 0.25-meter square plot for counting small plants, a 0.1-hectare plot for counting trees, or a soil core of a certain diameter and depth for counting soil organisms. The counts from multiple quadrats are averaged to estimate the number of individuals per unit area or volume, which can then be extrapolated to estimate the total population size. This approach works well if the quadrats accurately represent the population and the counts are accurate within each quadrat. To ensure that quadrats provide a good representation of the population, ecologists often place quadrats at random or evenly spaced intervals along a transect line or grid. The use of multiple quadrats enhances the representativeness of the sample.

The term "covered region" is used to describe the survey region that was sampled for the plot. "Covered area" is used to refer to the surface area that was sampled for the plot. If the entire survey region is covered in this manner, and the survey region equals the covered region rather than a subset of plots that are then used for extrapolation, this is considered a census rather than a plot sampling approach. Plot samples only deal with samples where the covered region is smaller than the survey region.

To estimate the total number of organisms in a survey region based on the amount of organisms in the covered region, there are two approaches. The first is design-based methods, which examine the randomness in the plots and relate it to the entire survey region. The second approach is model-based methods, which uses statistical models to relate the numbers to the survey region. Depending on the species you are examining, both approaches can be useful.

== History ==
In 1905 the first plots were described by Frederic Clements and many variations have developed since. The ability to quantify species abundance and statistically analyze this has been extremely helpful in studying community and population dynamics. Although plot sampling has limitations, it laid the foundation for more intensive sampling methods.

== See also ==
- Mark and recapture
