= North American Bird Banding Program =

The North American Bird Banding Program (NABBP), along with its Bird Banding Laboratory (BBL), has its home at the Patuxent Wildlife Research Center. The program is jointly administered by the Canadian Wildlife Service (and its Bird Banding Office) and the United States Geological Survey. The program is responsible for many aspects of bird banding in the United States and Canada: it grants permits to bird banders, fills orders for bands of various sizes, collects data from banding stations, receives reports from people who have found birds carrying bands, and makes its database available to appropriate parties.

The Patuxent center also operates its own banding station on the refuge grounds.

== History ==
North American naturalists in the nineteenth century made efforts towards banding birds for later identification. In 1803, John James Audubon tied silver wire around the legs of nestling eastern phoebes and found two of the birds on their return to Pennsylvania the following spring. In Manitoba, Ernest Thompson Seton used printer's ink to mark snow buntings in 1882.

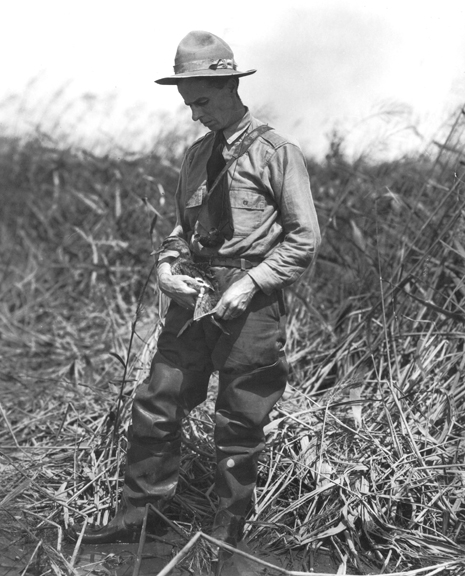
Frederick Charles Lincoln banding a duck

It is Paul Bartsch of the Smithsonian Institution who is credited with the first modern banding in the U.S.: he banded 23 black-crowned night herons in 1902. Leon J. Cole of the University of Wisconsin founded the American Bird Banding Association in 1909; this organization oversaw banding until the establishment of federal programs in the U.S. (1920) and Canada (1923) pursuant to Migratory Bird Treaty of 1916. The relevant legislation, respectively, is the Migratory Bird Treaty Act of 1918 and the Migratory Birds Convention Act.

The U.S. program was led by Frederick Charles Lincoln from 1920 to 1946. Lincoln espoused the flyways concept of avian migration and introduced the Lincoln index method for estimating bird abundance from recaptures.

In 1996, the North American Banding Council (NABC) was formed, with the mission of training banders in safe, ethical practices in the capture and handling of wild birds; the NABC also conducts optional certification at the Assistant, Bander, and Trainer levels.

== The program today ==
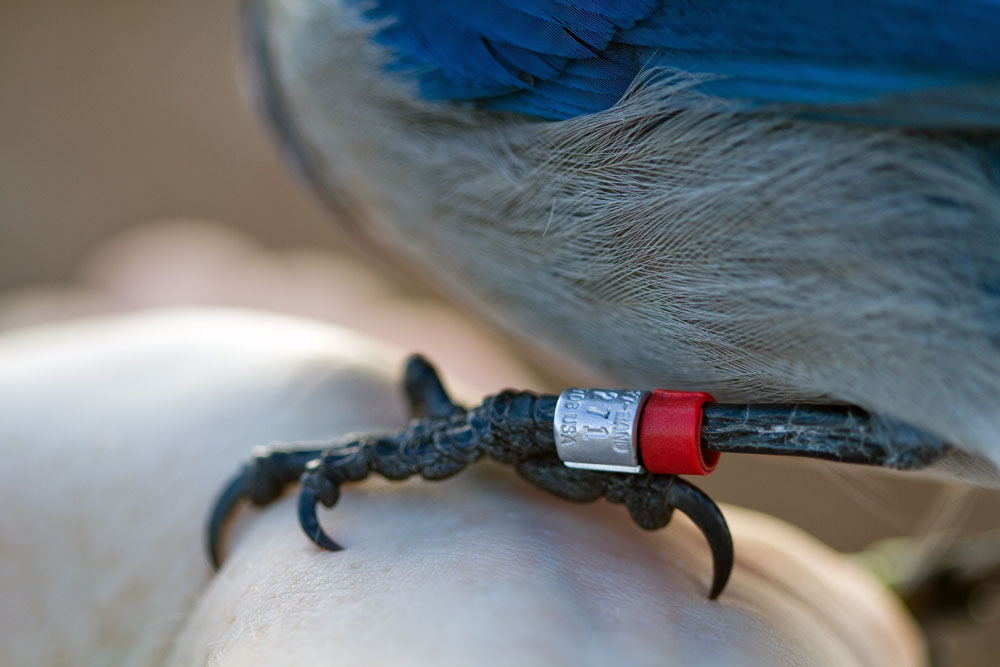
Bird bands on a Florida scrub jay

Today, approximately 6,000 banders are active in Canada and the U.S. As of January 2011, more than 64 million banding records have been received, and 3.5 million birds have been recovered and reported to the banding offices. On average, the BBL receives 1.2 million banding records annually.

Beyond the conventional leg band, field researchers use several other marking and data collection and analysis tools, among them colored bands visible in the field, radio and satellite transmitters, blood and feather samples, and advanced statistical modeling techniques. While studies of bird migrations are still important, banding in this century supports many other endeavors, including studies of avian behavior, ecology, and populations; preservation of endangered species; and regulating hunting of game species. In addition, banding activities provide information relevant to concerns for human health and safety—for example, West Nile disease and bird strikes near airports. Results from banding studies support international conservation programs like Partners in Flight and the North American Waterfowl Management Plan.

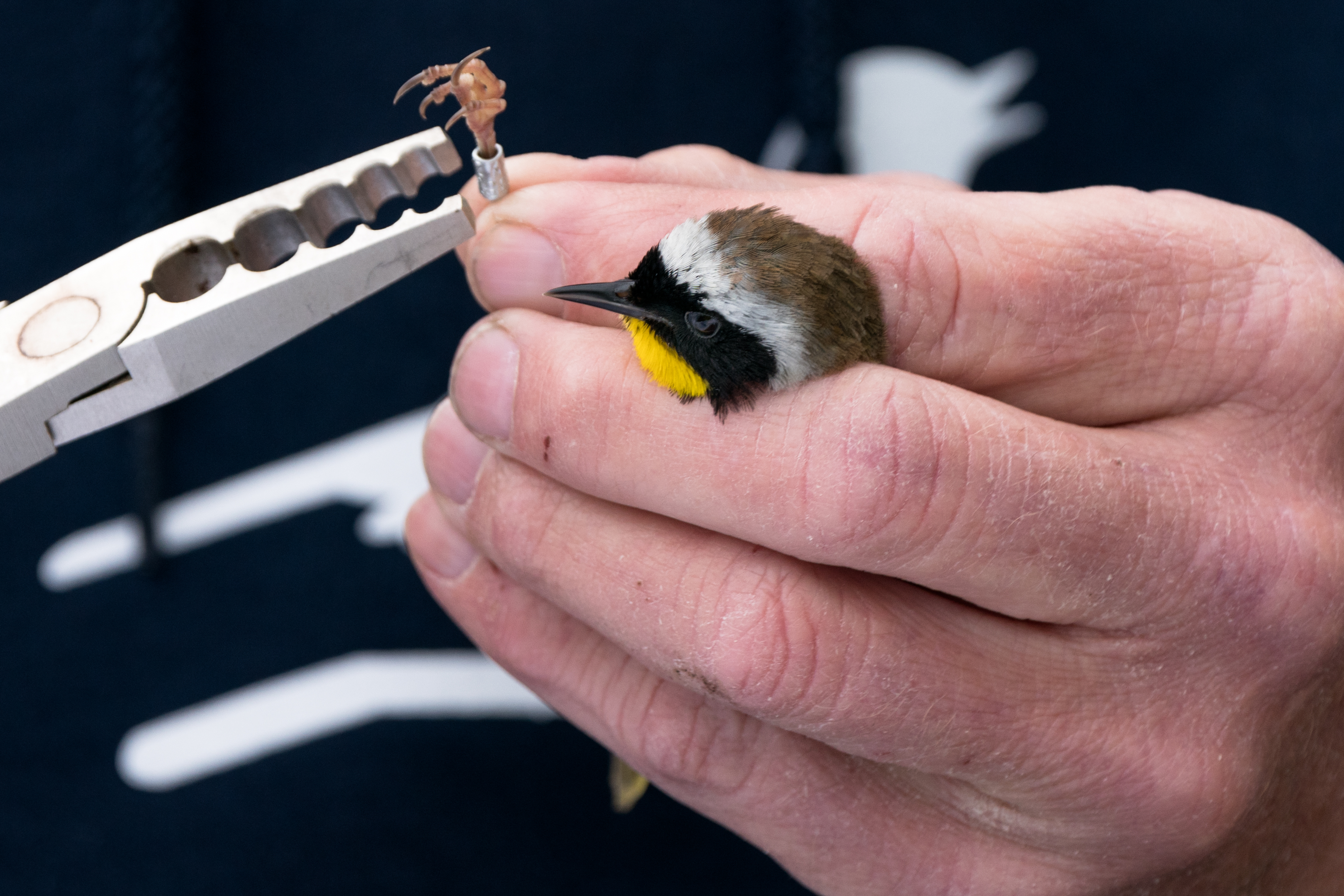
A researcher uses special banding pliers to attach a band to the leg of a Common yellowthroat

To receive a permit, an application is made to the federal agency of the country where the banding is to take place; additional permits from the province or state may also be required. An applicant must be fully trained prior to applying, and must submit a resume of past banding experience, references, and a research proposal. The prospective bander must be able to determine the species, age, and sex of the species to be banded.

A bird found with a band can be reported online. (In the past, reports were also accepted by telephone.) On request, the finder receives an electronic Certificate of Appreciation.
