= C.G. Johannes Petersen =

Danish marine biologist (1860–1928)

Carl Georg Johannes Petersen (24 October 1860 – 11 May 1928) was a Danish marine biologist, especially fisheries biologist. He was the first to describe communities of benthic marine invertebrates and is often considered a founder of modern fisheries research. Especially he was the first to use the Mark and recapture method which he used to estimate the size of a Plaice population. The Lincoln-Petersen method (also known as the Petersen-Lincoln index) is named after him and Frederick Charles Lincoln who first described the method in 1930.

== Biography ==
C.G.J. Petersen studied natural history at the University of Copenhagen under professor Japetus Steenstrup. He participated in expeditions 1883-1886 and sampled the benthic fauna in Danish waters systematically. In 1889, he co-founded Dansk biologisk Station, which was a mobile laboratory in a former naval transport vessel that was put in a new location every spring and anchored for the summer. His research was primarily directed towards understanding the ecology – not the least feeding ecology – and distribution of fish species and to provide the fundament for an evidence-based fisheries policy. Nevertheless, today he is mainly remembered for his significant contribution to the development of the community concept for marine benthos.

== Selected scientific works ==
- Petersen, C.G.J. (ed.) Det videnskabelige Udbytte af Kanonbaaden "Hauchs" Togter i de Danske Have indenfor Skagen i Aarene 1883–1886. 5 bind og atlas, Kjøbenhavn, 1889–1893.
- Petersen, C. G. J. (1896). "The Yearly Immigration of Young Plaice Into the Limfjord From the German Sea", Report of the Danish Biological Station (1895), 6, 5–84.
