= Environmental DNA =

DNA sampled from the environment rather than directly from an individual organism

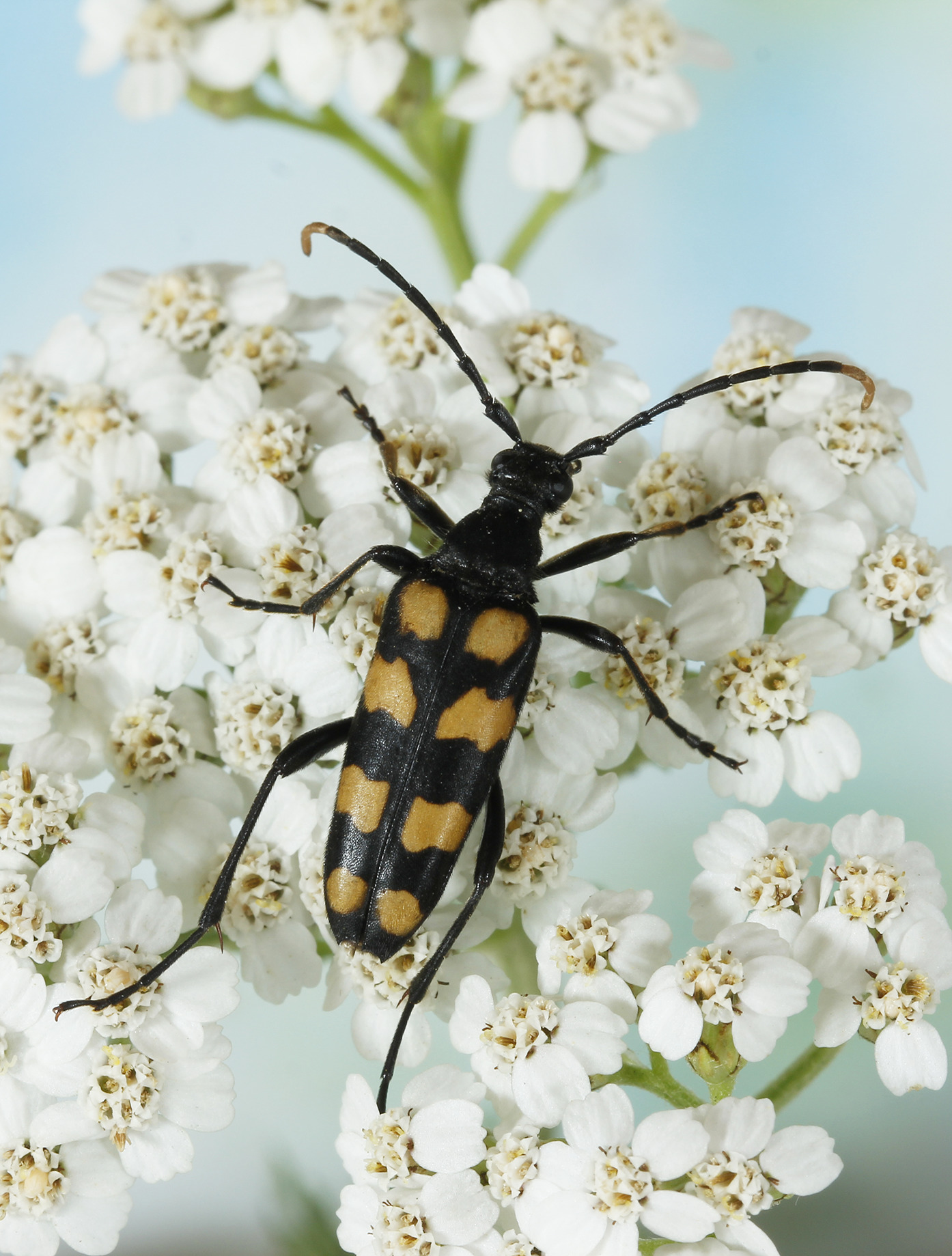
The longhorn beetle, Leptura quadrifasciata, is an example of a flower‐visiting insect found in a study which showed that environmental DNA (eDNA) from arthropods is deposited on wild flowers after interactions

Environmental DNA or eDNA is DNA that is collected from a variety of environmental samples such as soil, sediment, freshwater, seawater, snow or air, rather than directly sampled from an individual organism. As various organisms interact with the environment, DNA is expelled and accumulates in their surroundings from various sources. Such eDNA can be sequenced by environmental omics to reveal facts about the species that are present in an ecosystem — even microscopic ones not otherwise apparent or detectable. This approach enables low-cost, large-scale, and standardized biodiversity inventories, all without negatively impacting ecosystems.

In recent years, eDNA has been used as a tool to detect endangered wildlife that were otherwise unseen. In 2020, human health researchers began repurposing eDNA techniques to track the COVID-19 pandemic.

Example sources of eDNA include, but are not limited to, feces, mucus, gametes, shed skin, carcasses and hair. Samples can be analyzed by high-throughput DNA sequencing methods, known as metagenomics, metabarcoding, and single-species detection, for rapid monitoring and measurement of biodiversity. In order to better differentiate between organisms within a sample, DNA metabarcoding is used in which the sample is analyzed and uses previously studied DNA libraries, such as BLAST, to determine what organisms are present.

eDNA metabarcoding is a novel method of assessing biodiversity wherein samples are taken from the environment via water, sediment or air from which DNA is extracted, and then amplified using general or universal primers in polymerase chain reaction and sequenced using next-generation sequencing to generate thousands to millions of reads. From this data, species presence can be determined, and overall biodiversity assessed. It is an interdisciplinary method that brings together traditional field-based ecology with in-depth molecular methods and advanced computational tools.

The analysis of eDNA has great potential, not only for monitoring common species, but to genetically detect and identify other extant species that could influence conservation efforts. This method allows for biomonitoring without requiring collection of the living organism, creating the ability to study organisms that are invasive, elusive, or endangered without introducing anthropogenic stress on the organism (depends on the robustness of the methods used, see below). Access to this genetic information makes a critical contribution to the understanding of population size, species distribution, and population dynamics for species not well documented. Importantly, eDNA is often more cost-effective compared to traditional sampling methods. The integrity of eDNA samples is dependent upon its preservation within the environment.

Soil, permafrost, freshwater and seawater are well-studied macro environments from which eDNA samples have been extracted, each of which include many more conditioned subenvironments. Because of its versatility, eDNA is applied in many subenvironments such as freshwater sampling, seawater sampling, terrestrial soil sampling (tundra permafrost), aquatic soil sampling (river, lake, pond, and ocean sediment), or other environments where normal sampling procedures can become problematic.

On 7 December 2022 a study in Nature reported the recovery of two-million year old eDNA in sediments from Greenland, which is currently considered the oldest DNA sequenced so far.

Environmental DNA (eDNA) is applied using a wide range of sampling and analytical protocols, and the reliability of results strongly depends on the robustness of the methods used. In aquatic environments (freshwater and marine), sampling strategy is a key determinant of detection success. Larger filtered water volumes generally yield greater amounts of DNA, increasing the likelihood of detecting organisms present at a site. Because eDNA is often spatially heterogeneous and locally distributed, filtering larger volumes of water along integrated transects provides a more representative and accurate snapshot of biodiversity.

Laboratory procedures also play a critical role, particularly the number of polymerase chain reaction (PCR) replicates performed. PCR replication refers to the repeated amplification of the same DNA extract in independent reactions. Increasing the number of replicates improves detection probability, as PCR is subject to stochastic variation and a given species' DNA may fail to amplify in some reactions but succeed in others. For example, using 12 PCR replicates involves amplifying the sampled DNA in 12 independent subsamples, reducing the risk of false negatives.

Sequencing depth is another major factor influencing detection power. It refers to the total number of DNA sequences (reads) generated and analyzed from a sample. Higher sequencing depth increases the probability of detecting rare or low-abundance DNA fragments. Sequencing hundreds of thousands of reads in freshwater systems (up to 500 thousand) or up to around one million reads in marine systems can substantially enhance detection compared to lower-depth protocols, particularly for species present at low concentrations.

When robust sampling, replication, and sequencing strategies are applied, eDNA approaches are especially effective for detecting rare, elusive, or cryptic species, including protected, threatened, and invasive taxa.

== Overview ==
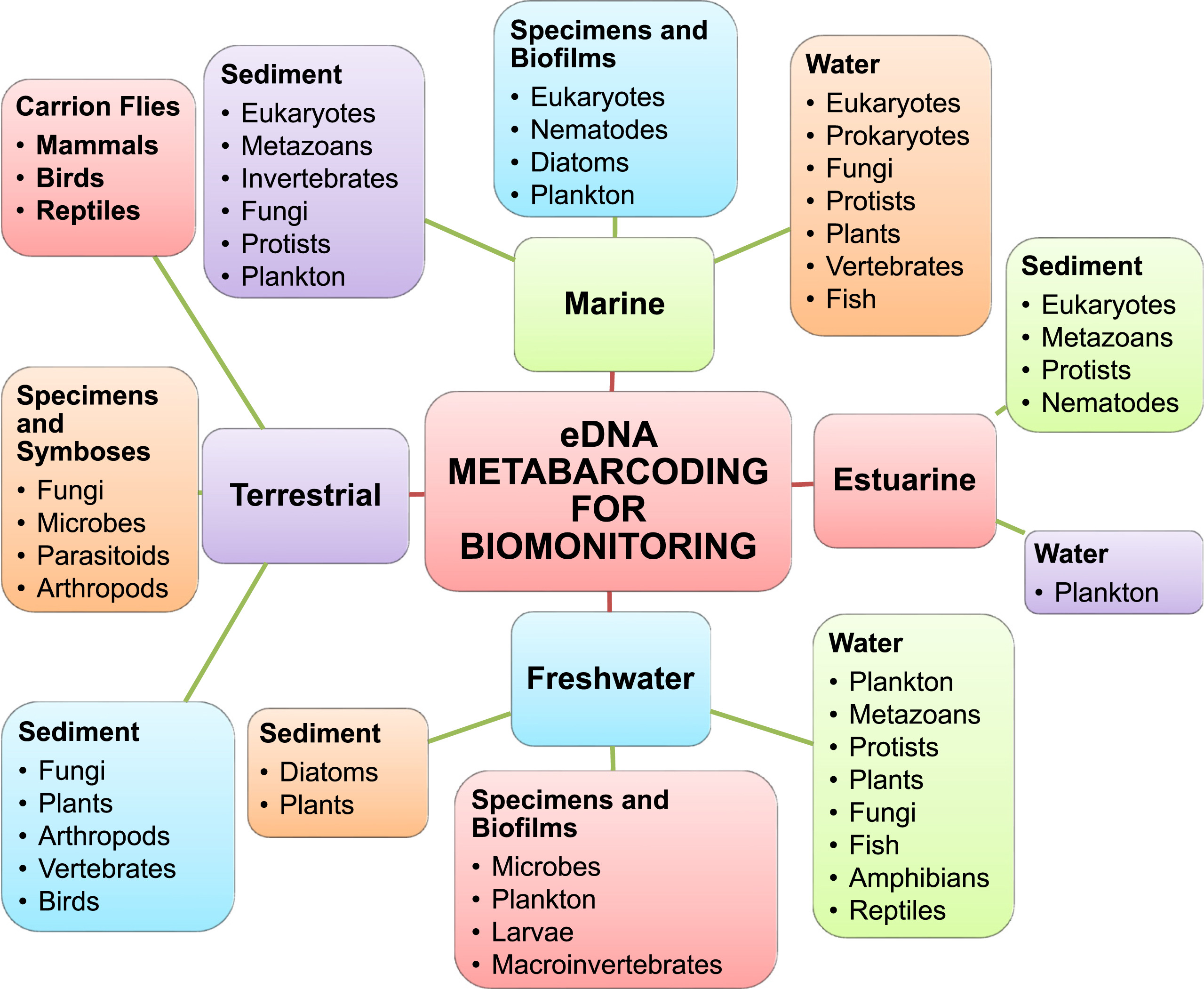
Global ecosystem and biodiversity monitoring
with environmental DNA metabarcoding

Environmental DNA or eDNA describes the genetic material present in environmental samples such as sediment, water, and air, including whole cells, extracellular DNA and potentially whole organisms. The analysis of eDNA starts with collecting an environmental sample of interest. The DNA in the sample is then extracted and purified. The purified DNA is then amplified for a specific gene target so it can be sequenced and categorised based on its sequence. From this information, detection and classification of species is possible.

eDNA can come from skin, mucous, saliva, sperm, secretions, eggs, feces, urine, blood, roots, leaves, fruit, pollen, and rotting bodies of larger organisms, while microorganisms may be obtained in their entirety. eDNA production is dependent on biomass, age and feeding activity of the organism as well as physiology, life history, and space use.

eDNA can complement but not replace conventional methods by targeting and sampling different diversity, and potentially increasing taxonomic resolution. Additionally, eDNA is capable of detecting rare species, but not of determining population quality information such as sex ratios and body conditions, so it is ideal for supplementing traditional studies. Regardless, it has useful applications in detecting the first occurrences of invasive species, the continued presence of native species thought to be extinct or otherwise threatened, and other elusive species occurring in low densities that would be difficult to detect by traditional means.

Absolute quantification of species abundance is only feasible under very specific conditions. In practice, this is largely restricted to wadeable rivers, where a narrow set of controlled environmental parameters can be met and where reference methods such as electrofishing are applicable. Outside of these limited contexts, both conventional ecological survey techniques and environmental DNA (eDNA) approaches generally provide only semi-quantitative information. In semi-quantitative frameworks, eDNA methods perform often better than traditional monitoring techniques. They reliably deliver ecological information such as species presence–absence, relative abundance patterns, and spatial and temporal trends. These data types are widely used in biodiversity assessment and long-term monitoring. Environmental DNA approaches also offer several practical advantages over many conventional methods. These include higher detectability, particularly for rare, cryptic, or low-density species; improved standardization across sites, seasons, and operators; lower overall operational costs; and non-invasive sampling that avoids disturbance or mortality of target organisms.

Degradation of eDNA in the environment limits the scope of eDNA studies, as often only small segments of genetic material remain, particularly in warm, tropical regions. Additionally, the varying lengths of time to degradation based on environmental conditions and the potential of DNA to travel throughout media such as water can affect inference of fine-scale spatiotemporal trends of species and communities.

Studies show that in both freshwater sites and oceans, DNA traces last only a few days, sometimes up to a week. That's why eDNA is like a snapshot: it captures which species were present, at that site and exact moment in time.

Despite these drawbacks, eDNA still has the potential to determine relative or rank abundance as some studies have found it to correspond with biomass, though the variation inherent in environmental samples makes it difficult to quantify. While eDNA has numerous applications in conservation, monitoring, and ecosystem assessment, as well as others yet to be described, the highly variable concentrations of eDNA and potential heterogeneity through the water body makes it essential that the procedure is optimized, ideally with a pilot study for each new application to ensure that the sampling design is appropriate to detect the target.

When comparing results obtained using different filters (water samples) or when monitoring biodiversity changes over time, across seasons, or between years, data standardization is required. Standardization corrects for methodological biases introduced throughout the analytical process, as DNA from different species can amplify and sequence with varying efficiencies. This calibration is typically based on estimates of the initial number of DNA molecules present in the sample prior to amplification, often referred to as DNA copy numbers, combined with relative abundance metrics derived from sequencing data. Standardized datasets enable more reliable comparisons across samples, sites, and time periods.

=== Community DNA ===
While the definition of eDNA seems straightforward, the lines between different forms of DNA become blurred, particularly in comparison to community DNA, which is described as bulk organismal samples. A question arises regarding whole microorganisms captured in eDNA samples: do these organisms alter the classification of the sample to a community DNA sample? Additionally, the classification of genetic material from feces is problematic and often referred to as eDNA. Differentiation between the two is important as community DNA indicates organismal presence at a particular time and place, while eDNA may have come from a different location, from predator feces, or from past presence, however this differentiation is often impossible. However, eDNA can be loosely classified as including many sectors of DNA biodiversity research, including fecal analysis and bulk samples when they are applicable to biodiversity research and ecosystem analysis.

=== selfDNA ===
The concept of selfDNA stems from discoveries made by scientists from the University of Naples Federico II, which were reported during 2015 in the journal New Phytologist, about the self-inhibitory effect of extracellular DNA in plants, but also in bacteria, fungi, algae, plants, protozoa and insects. The environmental source of such extracellular DNA is proposed to be plant litter but also other sources in different ecosystems and organisms, with the size of DNA fragments experimentally shown to have an inhibitory effect upon their conspecific organisms typically ranging between 200 and 500 base pairs. The selfDNA phenomenon has been postulated to drive ecological interactions and to be mechanistically mediated by damage-associated molecular patterns (DAMPs) and to have potential for the development of biocidal applications.

== eDNA metabarcoding ==
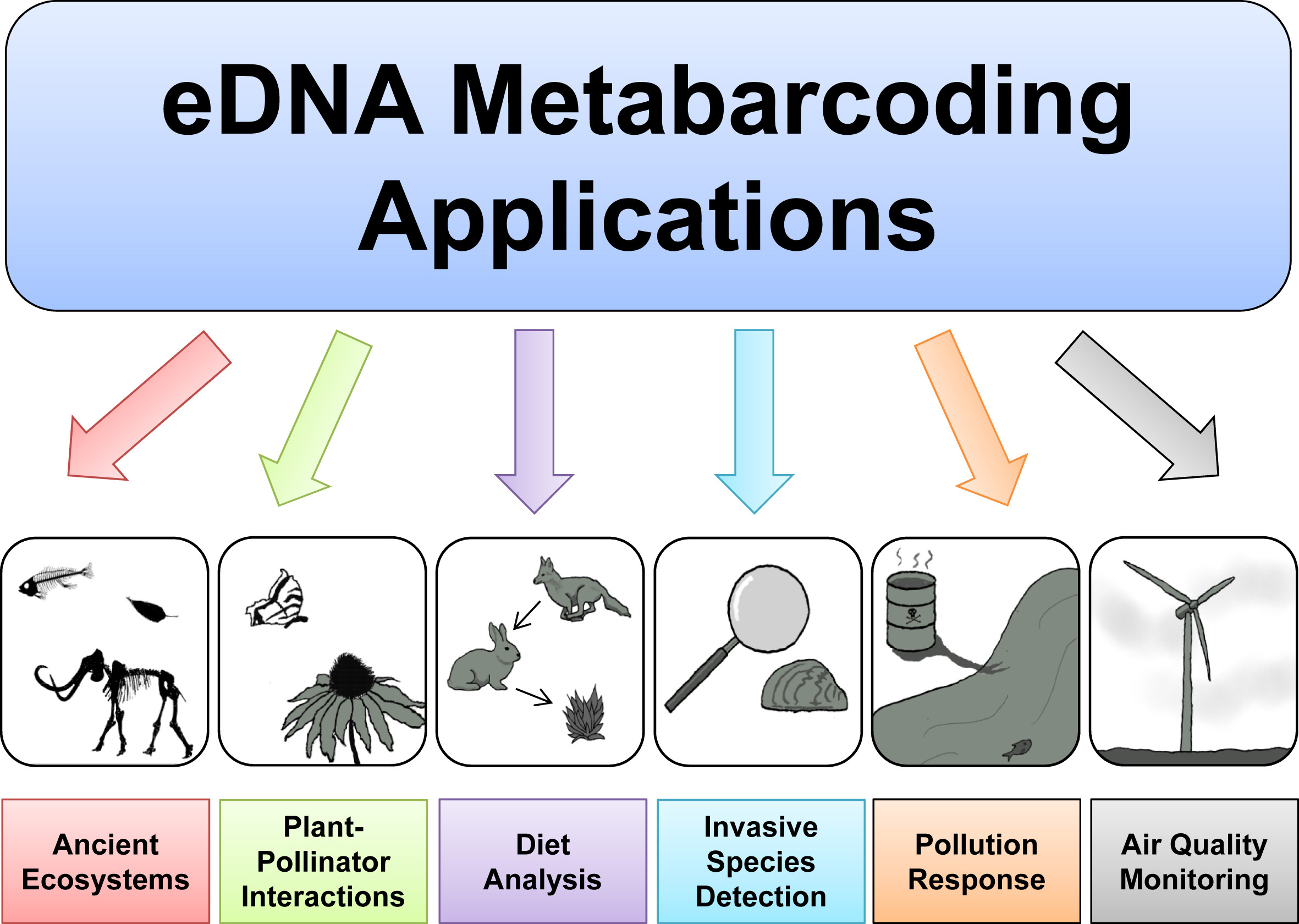
Applications of environmental DNA metabarcoding in aquatic and terrestrial ecosystems

By 2019 methods in eDNA research had been expanded to be able to assess whole communities from a single sample. This process involves metabarcoding, which can be precisely defined as the use of general or universal polymerase chain reaction (PCR) primers on mixed DNA samples from any origin followed by high-throughput next-generation sequencing (NGS) to determine the species composition of the sample. This method has been common in microbiology for years, but is only just finding its footing in assessment of macroorganisms. Ecosystem-wide applications of eDNA metabarcoding have the potential to not only describe communities and biodiversity, but also to detect interactions and functional ecology over large spatial scales, though it may be limited by false readings due to contamination or other errors. Altogether, eDNA metabarcoding increases speed, accuracy, and identification over traditional barcoding and decreases cost, but needs to be standardized and unified, integrating taxonomy and molecular methods for full ecological study.

eDNA metabarcoding has applications to diversity monitoring across all habitats and taxonomic groups, ancient ecosystem reconstruction, plant-pollinator interactions, diet analysis, invasive species detection, pollution responses, and air quality monitoring. eDNA metabarcoding is a unique method still in development and will likely remain in flux for some time as technology advances and procedures become standardized. However, as metabarcoding is optimized and its use becomes more widespread, it is likely to become an essential tool for ecological monitoring and global conservation study.

== Extracellular and relic DNA ==
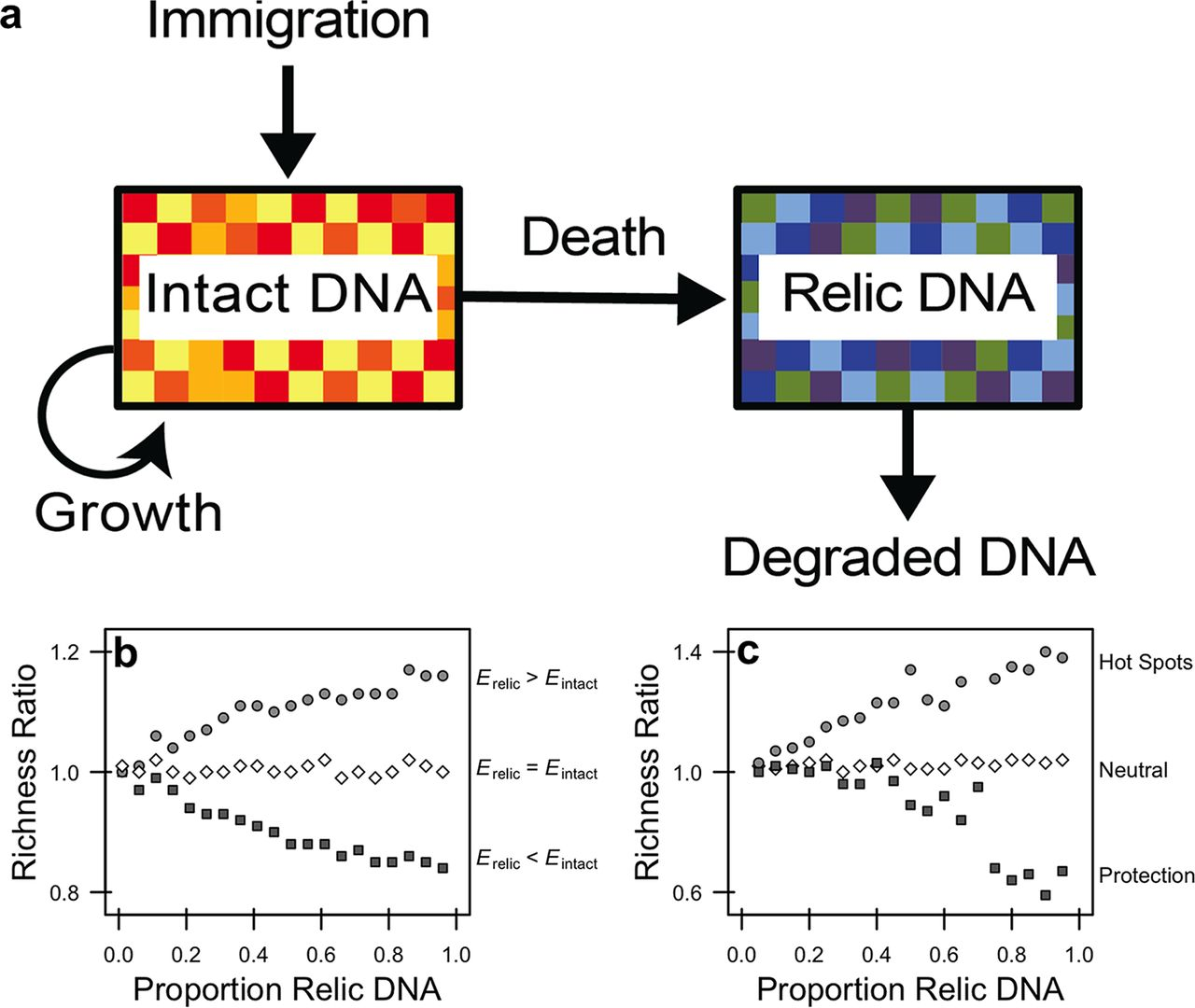
Relic DNA dynamics

Extracellular DNA, sometimes called relic DNA, is DNA from dead microbes. Naked extracellular DNA (eDNA), most of it released by cell death, is nearly ubiquitous in the environment. Its concentration in soil may be as high as 2 μg/L, and its concentration in natural aquatic environments may be as high at 88 μg/L. Various possible functions have been proposed for eDNA: it may be involved in horizontal gene transfer; it may provide nutrients; and it may act as a buffer to recruit or titrate ions or antibiotics. Extracellular DNA acts as a functional extracellular matrix component in the biofilms of several bacterial species. It may act as a recognition factor to regulate the attachment and dispersal of specific cell types in the biofilm; it may contribute to biofilm formation; and it may contribute to the biofilm's physical strength and resistance to biological stress.

Under the name of environmental DNA, eDNA has seen increased use in the natural sciences as a survey tool for ecology, monitoring the movements and presence of species in water, air, or on land, and assessing an area's biodiversity.

In the diagram on the right, the amount of relic DNA in a microbial environment is determined by inputs associated with the mortality of viable individuals with intact DNA and by losses associated with the degradation of relic DNA. If the diversity of sequences contained in the relic DNA pool is sufficiently different from that in the intact DNA pool, then relic DNA may bias estimates of microbial biodiversity (as indicated by different colored boxes) when sampling from the total (intact + relic) DNA pool. Standardised Data on Initiatives (STARDIT) has been proposed as one way of standardising both data about sampling and analysis methods, and taxonomic and ontological relationships.

== Collection ==
=== Terrestrial sediments ===
Methods in modern and ancient marine genomics

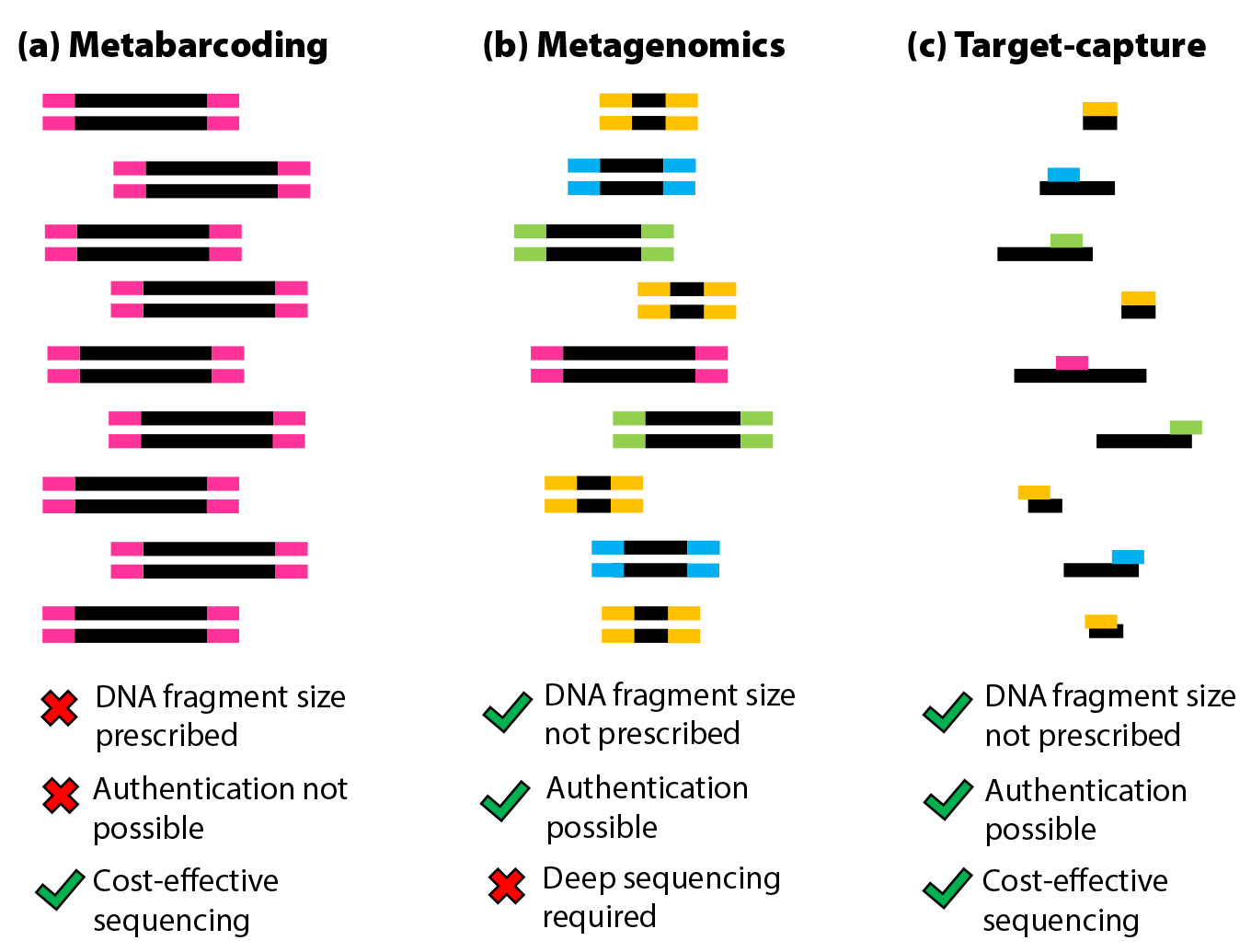
(a) Metabarcoding is the amplification and analysis of equally sized DNA fragments from a total DNA extract. (b) Metagenomics is the extraction, amplification, and analysis of all DNA fragments independent of size. (c) Target-capture describes the enrichment and analysis of specific (chosen) DNA fragments independent of size from a total DNA extract.

The importance of eDNA analysis stemmed from the recognition of the limitations presented by culture-based studies. Organisms have adapted to thrive in the specific conditions of their natural environments. Although scientists work to mimic these environments, many microbial organisms can not be removed and cultured in a laboratory setting. The earliest version of this analysis began with ribosomal RNA (rRNA) in microbes to better understand microbes that live in hostile environments. The genetic makeup of some microbes is then only accessible through eDNA analysis. Analytical techniques of eDNA were first applied to terrestrial sediments yielding DNA from both extinct and extant mammals, birds, insects and plants. Samples extracted from these terrestrial sediments are commonly referenced as 'sedimentary ancient DNA' (sedaDNA or dirtDNA). The eDNA analysis can also be used to study current forest communities including everything from birds and mammals to fungi and worms. Samples can be obtained from soil, faeces, 'bite DNA' from where leaves have been bitten, plants and leaves where animals have been, and from the blood meals of captured mosquitos which may have eaten blood from any animals in the area. Some methods can also attempt to capture cells with hair traps and sandpaper in areas commonly transversed by target species.

=== Aquatic sediments ===
The sedaDNA was subsequently used to study ancient animal diversity and verified using known fossil records in aquatic sediments. The aquatic sediments are deprived of oxygen and thus protects the DNA from degrading. Other than ancient studies, this approach can be used to understand current animal diversity with relatively high sensitivity. While typical water samples can have the DNA degrade relatively quickly, the aquatic sediment samples can have useful DNA two months after the species was present. One problem with aquatic sediments is that it is unknown where the organism deposited the eDNA as it could have moved in the water column.

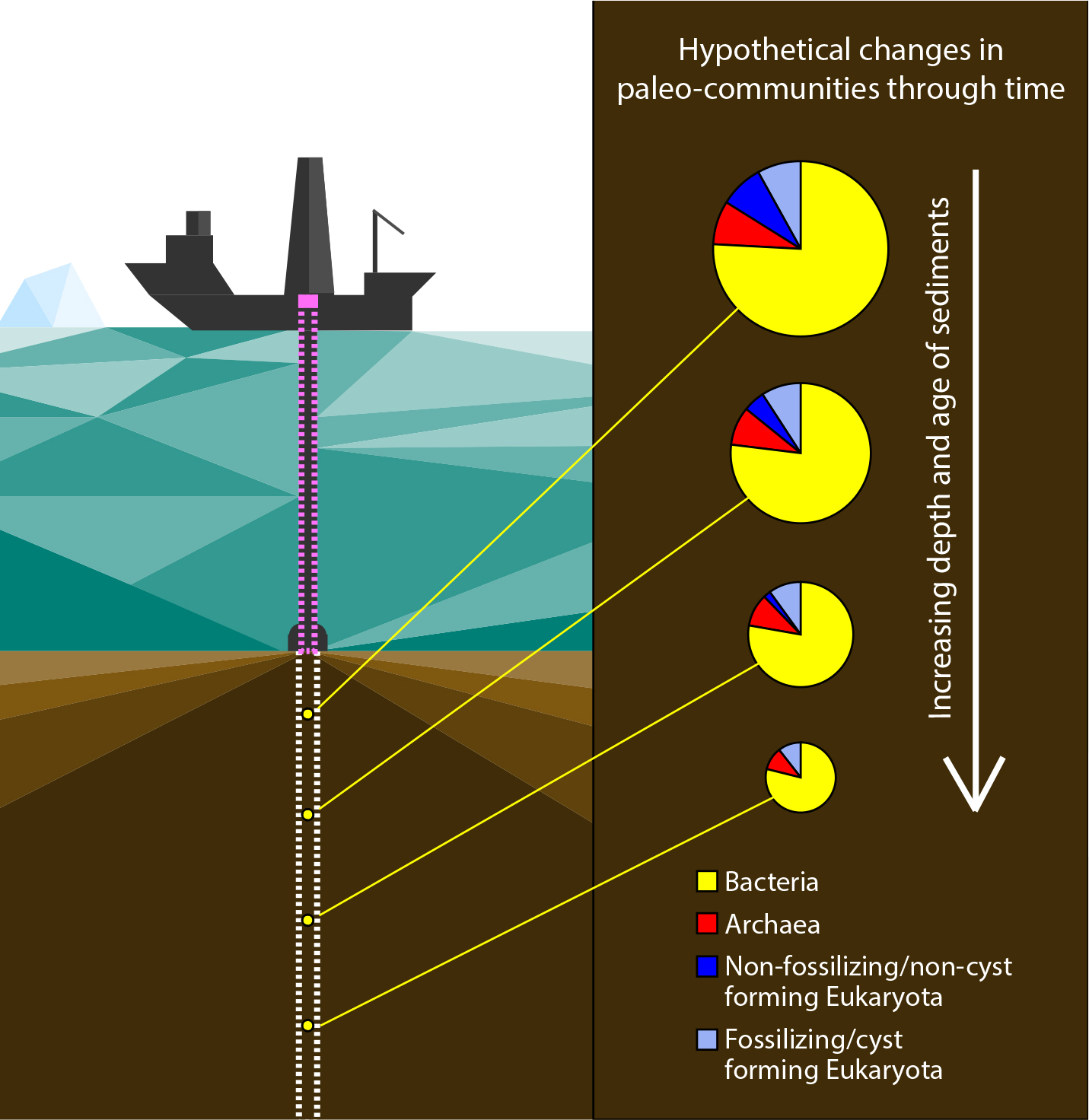
Drilling vessel recovering a sediment core for sedaDNA analysis and hypothetical past marine community composition

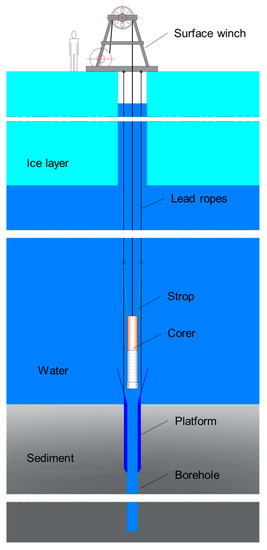
Subglacial aquatic sediment continuous coring

=== Aquatic (water column) ===
Studying eDNA in the water column can indicate the community composition of a body of water. Before eDNA, the main ways to study open water diversity were to use electrofishing, netting and trapping. This method is effective as pH of the water does not affect the DNA as much as previously thought, and sensitivity can be increased relatively easily. Sensitivity is how likely the DNA marker will be present in the sampled water, and can be increased simply by taking more samples, having bigger samples, and increasing PCR. eDNA degrades relatively fast in the water column, which is very beneficial in short term conservation studies such as identifying what species are present.

Researchers at the Experimental Lakes Area in Ontario, Canada and McGill University have found that eDNA distribution reflects lake stratification. As seasons and water temperature change, water density also changes such that it forms distinct layers in small boreal lakes in the summer and winter. These layers mix during the spring and fall. Fish habitat use correlates to stratification (e.g. a cold-water fish like lake trout will stay in cold water) and so does eDNA distribution, as these researchers found.

== Monitoring species ==
eDNA can be used to monitor species throughout the year and can be very useful in conservation monitoring. eDNA analysis has been successful at identifying many different taxa from aquatic plants, aquatic mammals, fishes, mussels, terrestrial mammals, fungi and even parasites. eDNA has been used to study species while minimizing any stress inducing human interaction, allowing researchers to monitor species presence at larger spatial scales more efficiently. The most prevalent use in current research is using eDNA to study the locations of species at risk, invasive species, and keystone species across all environments. eDNA is especially useful for studying species with small populations because eDNA is sensitive enough to confirm the presence of a species with relatively little effort to collect data which can often be done with a soil sample or water sample. eDNA relies on the efficiency of genomic sequencing and analysis as well as the survey methods used which continue to become more efficient and cheaper. Some studies have shown that eDNA sampled from stream and inshore environments decayed to undetectable levels within about 48 hours.

Environmental DNA can be applied as a tool to detect low abundance organisms in both active and passive forms. Active eDNA surveys target individual species or groups of taxa for detection by using highly sensitive species-specific quantitative real-time PCR or digital droplet PCR markers. CRISPR-Cas methodology has also been applied to the detection of single species from eDNA; utilising the Cas12a enzyme and allowing greater specificity when detecting sympatric taxa. Passive eDNA surveys employ massively-parallel DNA sequencing to amplify all eDNA molecules in a sample with no a priori target in mind, providing blanket DNA evidence of biotic community composition.

=== Decline of terrestrial arthropods ===
Differentiation of arthropod communities by plant species

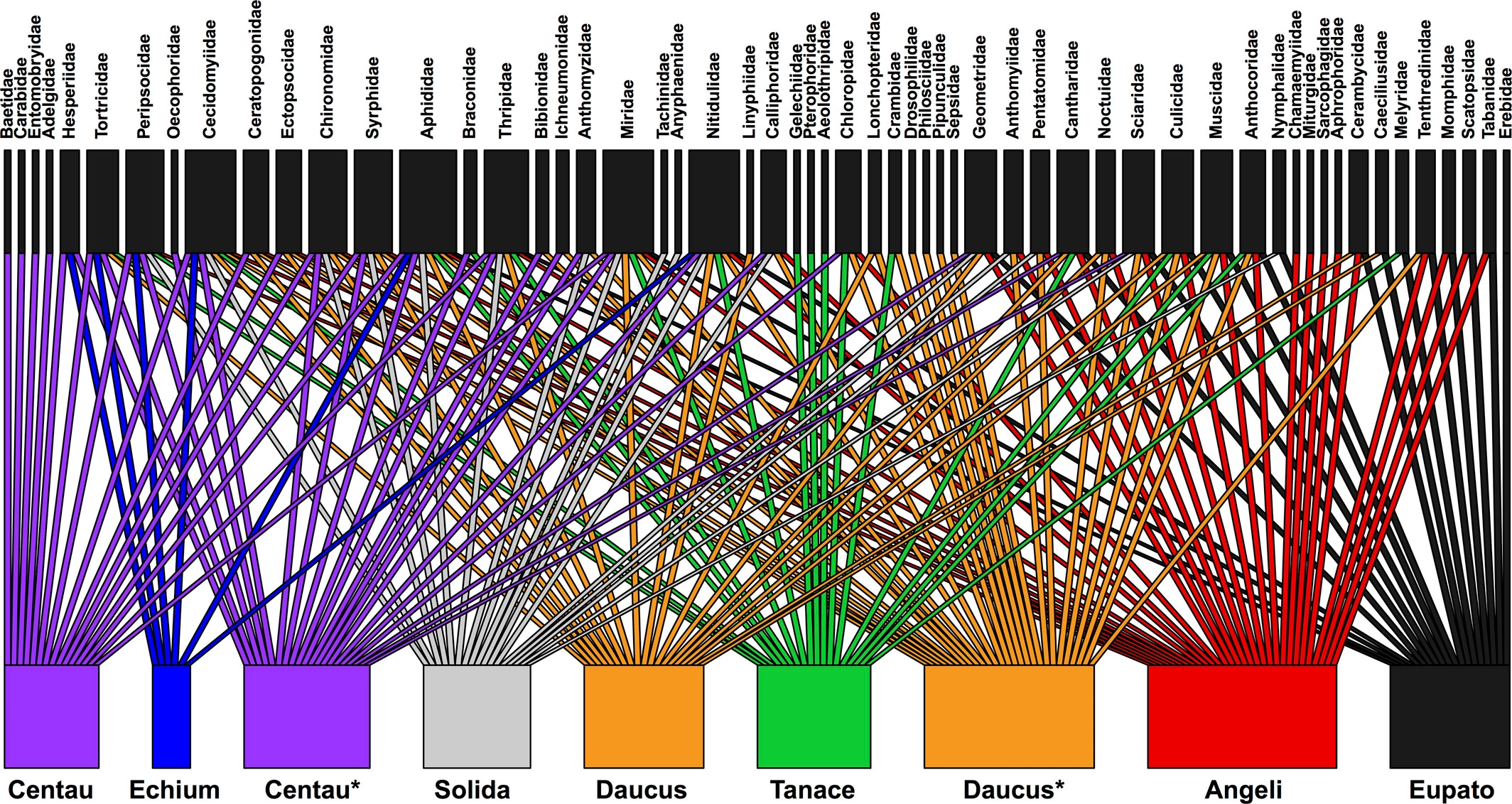
Bipartite plot for the COI gene, showing from which plants each arthropod family is obtained. Plant names: Angeli (Angelica archangelica), Centau (Centaurea jacea), Daucus (Daucus carota), Echium (Echium vulgare), Eupato (Eupatorium cannabinum), Solida (Solidago canadensis), Tanace (Tanacetum vulgare).

Terrestrial arthropods are experiencing massive decline in Europe as well as globally, although only a fraction of the species have been assessed and the majority of insects are still undescribed to science. As one example, grassland ecosystems are home to diverse taxonomic and functional groups of terrestrial arthropods, such as pollinators, phytophagous insects, and predators, that use nectar and pollen for food sources, and stem and leaf tissue for food and development. These communities harbor endangered species, since many habitats have disappeared or are under significant threat. Therefore, extensive efforts are being conducted in order to restore European grassland ecosystems and conserve biodiversity. For instance, pollinators like bees and butterflies represent an important ecological group that has undergone severe decline in Europe, indicating a dramatic loss of grassland biodiversity. The vast majority of flowering plants are pollinated by insects and other animals both in temperate regions and the tropics. The majority of insect species are herbivores feeding on different parts of plants, and most of these are specialists, relying on one or a few plant species as their main food resource. However, given the gap in knowledge on existing insect species, and the fact that most species are still undescribed, it is clear that for the majority of plant species in the world, there is limited knowledge about the arthropod communities they harbor and interact with.

Terrestrial arthropod communities have traditionally been collected and studied using methods, such as Malaise traps and pitfall traps, which are very effective but somewhat cumbersome and potentially invasive methods. In some instances, these techniques fall short of performing efficient and standardized surveys, due to, for example, phenotypic plasticity, closely related species, and difficulties in identifying juvenile stages. Furthermore, morphological identification depends directly on taxonomic expertise, which is in decline. All such limitations of traditional biodiversity monitoring have created a demand for alternative approaches. Meanwhile, the advance in DNA sequencing technologies continuously provides new means of obtaining biological data. Hence, several new molecular approaches have recently been suggested for obtaining fast and efficient data on arthropod communities and their interactions through non‐invasive genetic techniques. This includes extracting DNA from sources such as bulk samples or insect soups, empty leaf mines, spider webs, pitcher plant fluid, environmental samples like soil, water, air, and even whole flowers (environmental DNA [eDNA]), host plant and predatory diet identification from insect DNA extracts, and predator scat from bats. Recently, also DNA from pollen attached to insects has been used for retrieving information on plant–pollinator interactions. Many of such recent studies rely on DNA metabarcoding—high‐throughput sequencing of PCR amplicons using generic primers.

=== Mammals ===
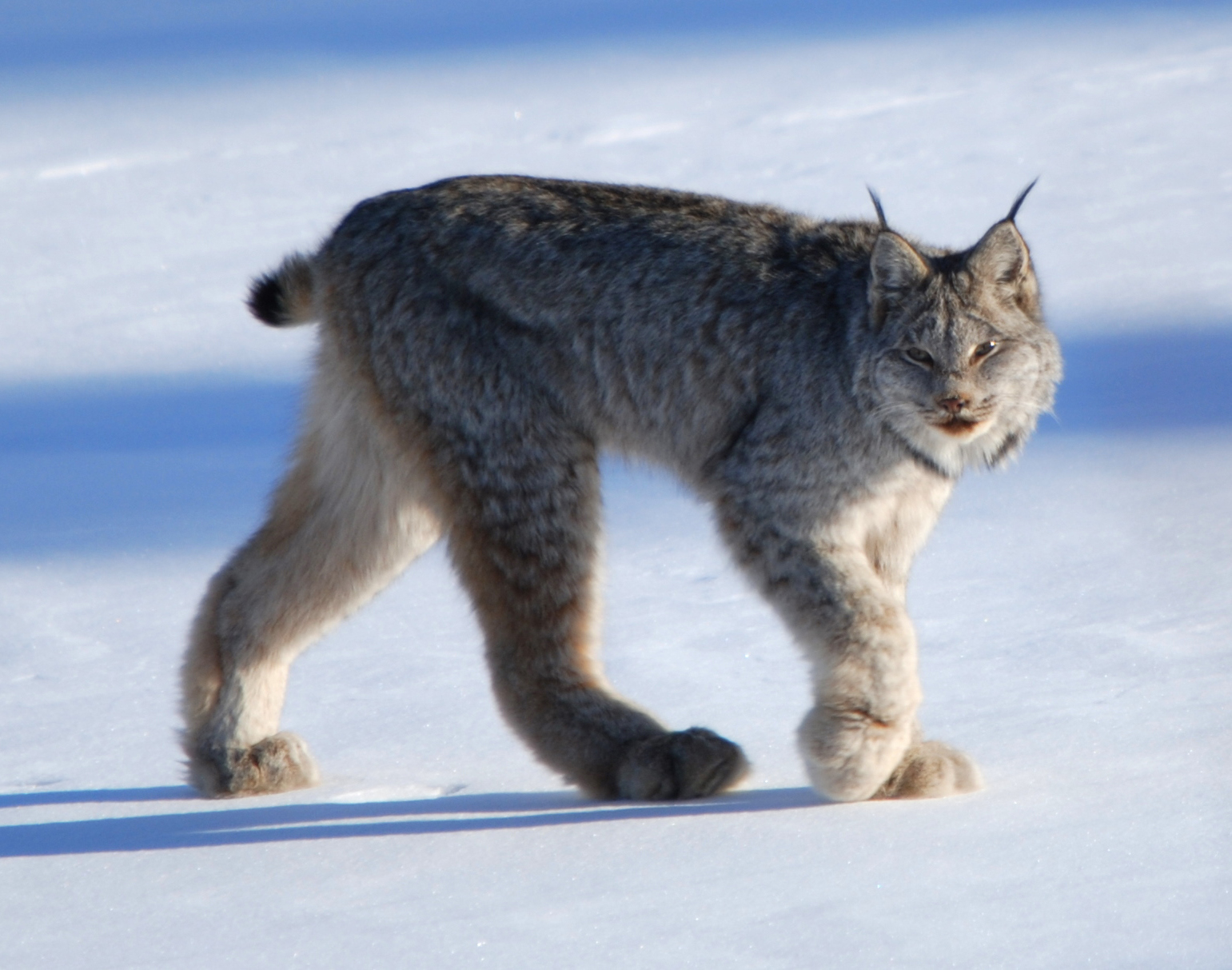
Canada lynx

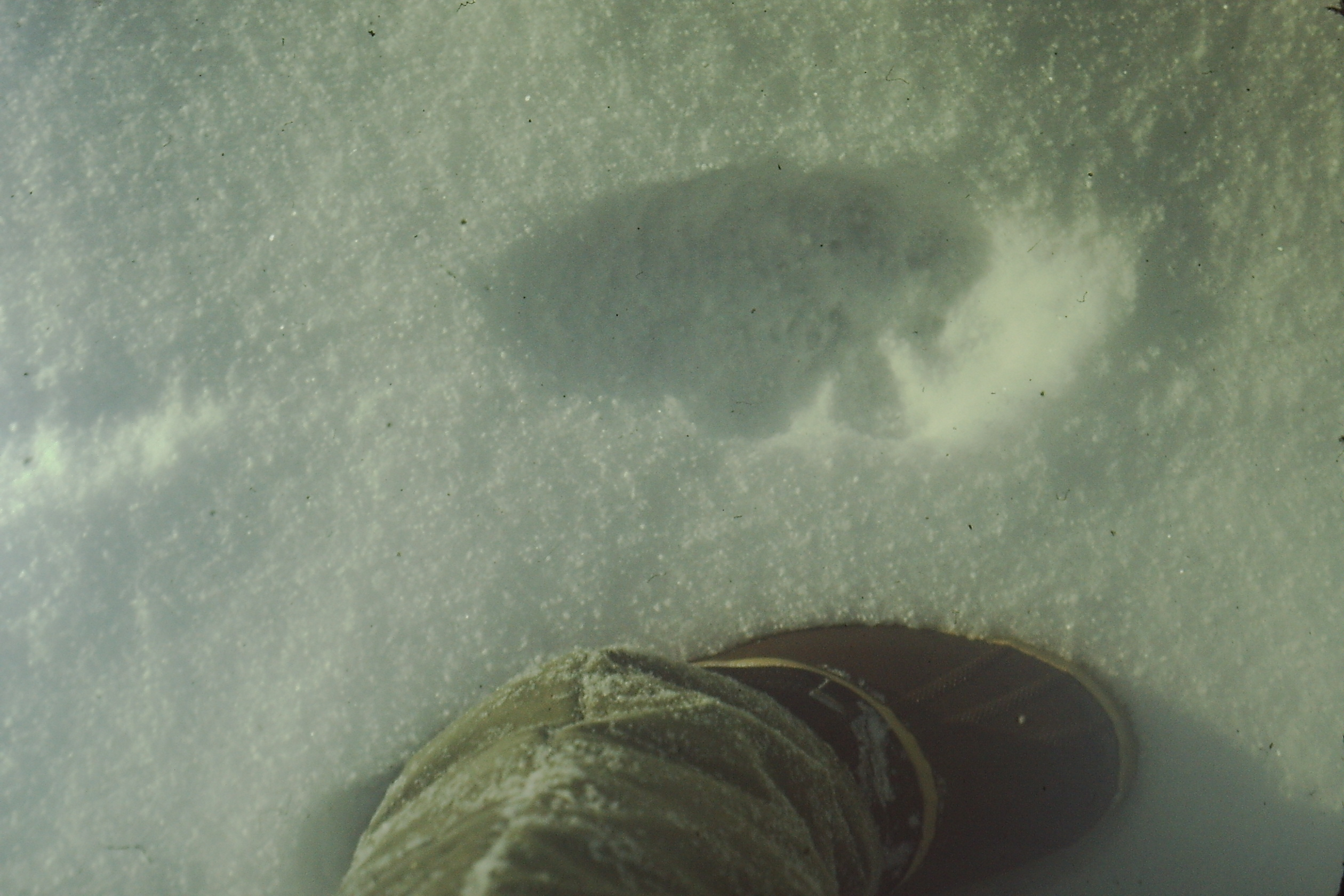
Tracks of a Canada lynx in snow

==== Snow tracks ====
Wildlife researchers in snowy areas also use snow samples to gather and extract genetic information about species of interest. DNA from snow track samples has been used to confirm the presence of such elusive and rare species as polar bears, arctic fox, lynx, wolverines, and fishers.

==== DNA from the air ====
In 2021, researchers demonstrated that eDNA can be collected from air and used to identify mammals. In 2023, scientists developed a specialized sampling probe and aircraft surveys to assess biodiversity of multiple taxa, including mammals, using air eDNA.

Airborne environmental DNA (airDNA) has been shown to function as a practical tool for surveying terrestrial vertebrates, even in complex tropical forest environments. A 2026 study in Madagascar demonstrated that airDNA sampling, using battery‑powered pumps to filter large volumes of air, consistently detected mammals across fragmented forest landscapes and demonstrated an expected decline in richness across a fragmentation gradient. Although airDNA recovered fewer taxa than invertebrate‑derived DNA (iDNA), it proved more operationally reliable under field conditions and successfully identified endemic and threatened species, highlighting its growing value as a non‑invasive method for monitoring wildlife in remote or inaccessible habitats.

=== Managing fisheries ===
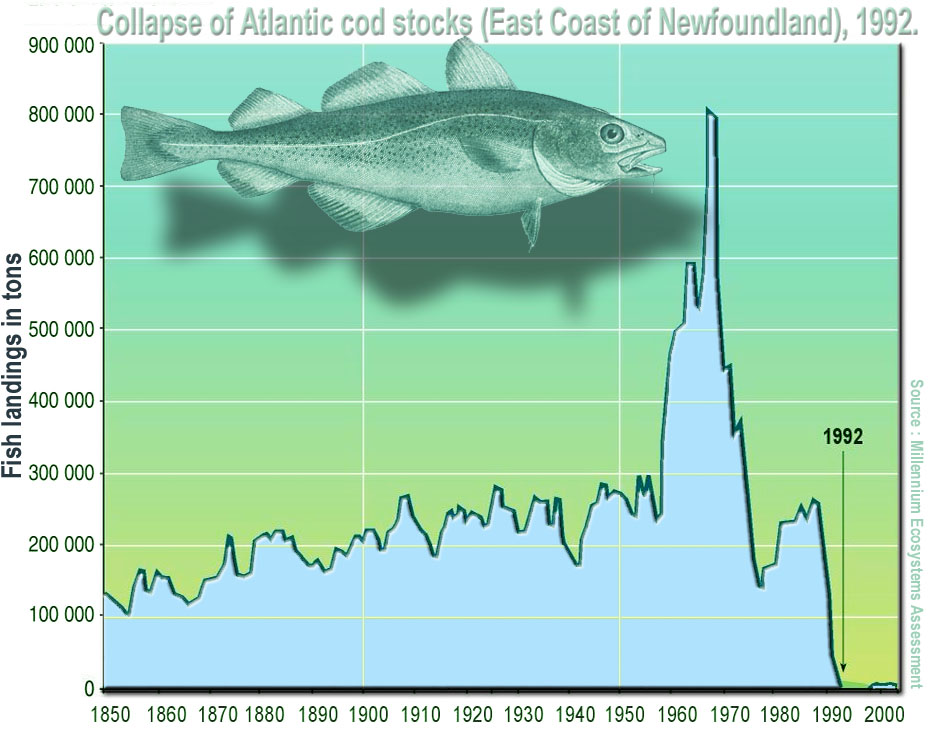
Overfishing the Canadian northern cod fishery resulted in catastrophic collapse

In this example, a fish leaves eDNA behind in a trail as it moves through the water, but the trail dissipates slowly over time (click to enlarge)

The successful management of commercial fisheries relies on standardised surveys to estimate the quantity and distribution of fish stocks. Atlantic cod (Gadus morhua) is an iconic example that demonstrates how poorly constrained data and uninformed decision making can result in catastrophic stock decline and ensuing economic and social problems. Traditional stock assessments of demersal fish species have relied primarily on trawl surveys, which have provided a valuable stream of information to decision makers. However, there are some notable drawbacks of demersal trawl surveys including cost, gear selectivity/catchability, habitat destruction and restricted coverage (e.g. hard-substrate bottom environments, marine protected areas).

Environmental DNA (eDNA) has emerged as a potentially powerful alternative for studying ecosystem dynamics. The constant loss and shedding of genetic material from macroorganisms imparts a molecular footprint in environmental samples that can be analysed to determine either the presence of specific target species or characterise biodiversity. The combination of next generation sequencing and eDNA sampling has been successfully applied in aquatic systems to document spatial and temporal patterns in the diversity of fish fauna. To further develop the utility of eDNA for fisheries management, understanding the ability of eDNA quantities to reflect fish biomass in the ocean is an important next step.

Positive relationships between eDNA quantities and fish biomass and abundance have been demonstrated in experimental systems. However, known variations between eDNA production and degradation rates are anticipated to complicate these relationships in natural systems. Furthermore, in oceanic systems, large habitat volumes and strong currents are likely to result in physical dispersal of DNA fragments away from target organisms. These confounding factors have been previously considered to restrict the application of quantitative eDNA monitoring in oceanic settings.

Despite these potential constraints, numerous studies in marine environments have found positive relationships between eDNA quantities and complimentary survey efforts including radio-tagging, visual surveys, echo-sounding and trawl surveys. However, studies that quantify target eDNA concentrations of commercial fish species with standardised trawl surveys in marine environments are much scarcer.

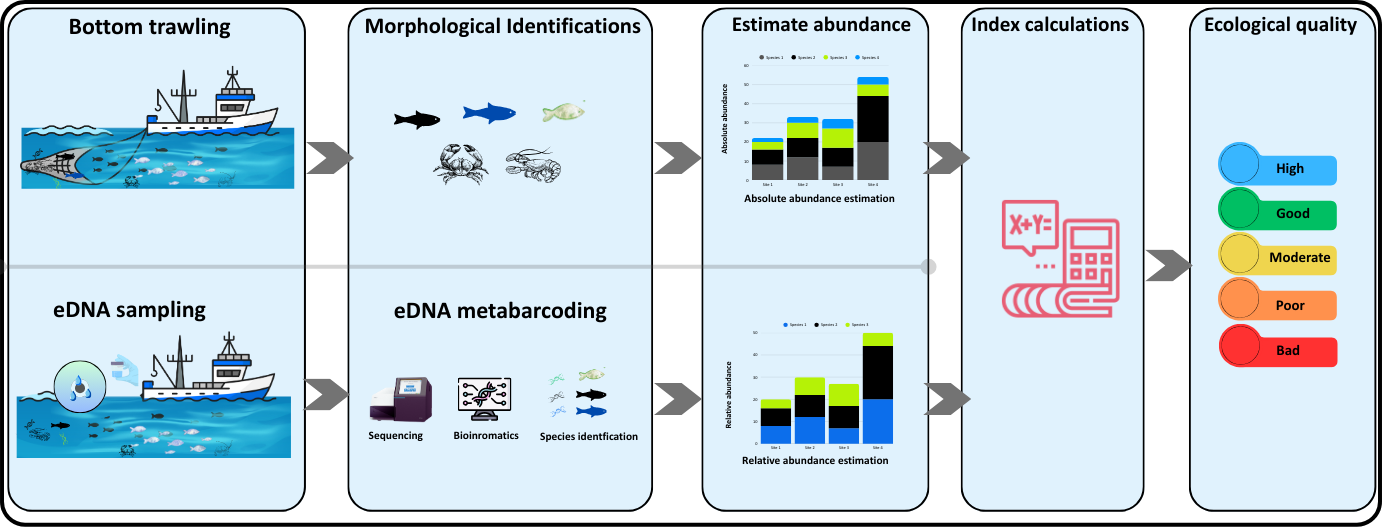
Comparison of ecological assessment workflows: traditional bottom trawling (top) versus eDNA metabarcoding (bottom). Both methods feed into index calculations to determine ecological quality status, using absolute versus relative abundance respectively.

In this context, direct comparisons of eDNA concentrations with biomass and stock assessment metrics, such as catch per unit effort (CPUE), are necessary to understand the applicability of eDNA monitoring to contribute to fisheries management efforts. Recent studies have expanded these applications, demonstrating that eDNA can be integrated into estuarine fish indices for ecological assessment and utilized to manage fisheries in tropical environments where traditional data is often limited.

== Deep sea sediments ==
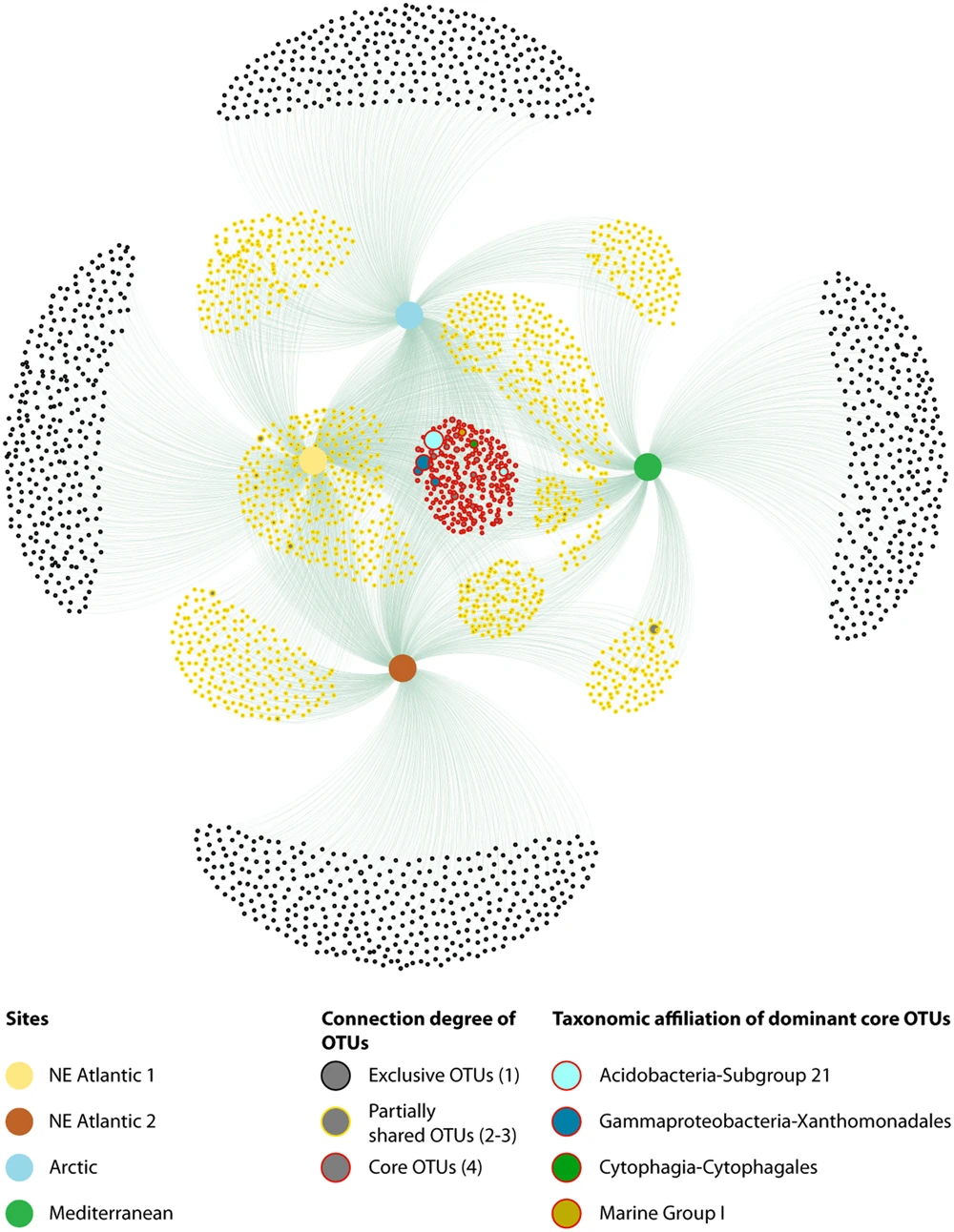
OTU (operational taxonomic unit) network of the extracellular DNA pools from the sediments of the different continental margins.

Extracellular DNA in surface deep-sea sediments is by far the largest reservoir of DNA of the world oceans. The main sources of extracellular DNA in such ecosystems are represented by in situ DNA release from dead benthic organisms, and/or other processes including cell lysis due to viral infection, cellular exudation and excretion from viable cells, virus decomposition, and allochthonous inputs from the water column. Previous studies provided evidence that an important fraction of extracellular DNA can escape degradation processes, remaining preserved in the sediments. This DNA represents, potentially, a genetic repository that records biological processes occurring over time.

Recent investigations revealed that DNA preserved in marine sediments is characterized by a large number of highly diverse gene sequences. In particular, extracellular DNA has been used to reconstruct past prokaryotic and eukaryotic diversity in benthic ecosystems characterized by low temperatures and/or permanently anoxic conditions.

The diagram on the right shows the OTU (operational taxonomic unit) network of the extracellular DNA pools from the sediments of the different continental margins. The dot size within the network is proportional to the abundance of sequences for each OTU. Dots circled in red represent extracellular core OTUs, dot circled in yellow are partially shared (among two or more pools) OTUs, dots circled in black are OTUs exclusive of each pool. The core OTUs contributing at least for 20 sequences are shown. The numbers in parentheses represent the number of connections among OTUs and samples: 1 for exclusive OTUs, 2–3 for partially shared OTUs and 4 for core OTUs.

Previous studies suggested that the preservation of DNA might be also favoured in benthic systems characterised by high organic matter inputs and sedimentation rates, such as continental margins. These systems, which represent ca. 15% of the global seafloor, are also hotspots of benthic prokaryotic diversity, and therefore they could represent optimal sites to investigate the prokaryotic diversity preserved within extracellular DNA.

Spatial distribution of prokaryotic diversity has been intensively studied in benthic deep-sea ecosystems through the analysis of "environmental DNA" (i.e., the genetic material obtained directly from environmental samples without any obvious signs of biological source material). However, the extent to which gene sequences contained within extracellular DNA can alter the estimates of the diversity of the present-day prokaryotic assemblages is unknown.

== Sedimentary ancient DNA ==
Analyses of ancient DNA preserved in various archives have transformed understanding of the evolution of species and ecosystems. Whilst earlier studies have concentrated on DNA extracted from taxonomically constrained samples (such as bones or frozen tissue), advances in high-throughput sequencing and bioinformatics now allow the analysis of ancient DNA extracted from sedimentary archives, so called sedaDNA. The accumulation and preservation of sedaDNA buried in land and lake sediments have been subject to active research and interpretation. However, studying the deposition of DNA on the ocean floor and its preservation in marine sediments is more complex because the DNA has to travel through a water column for several kilometers. Unlike in the terrestrial environment, with pervasive transport of subfossil biomass from land, the largest portion of the marine sedaDNA is derived from planktonic community, which is dominated by marine microbes and marine protists. After the death of the surface plankton, its DNA is subject to a transport through the water column, during which much of the associated organic matter is known to be consumed and respired. This transport could take between 3 and 12 days depending on the size and morphology of test. However, it remains unclear how exactly the planktonic eDNA, defined as the total DNA present in the environment after, survives this transport, whether the degradation or transport are associated with sorting or lateral advection, and finally, whether the eDNA arriving at the seafloor is preserved in marine sediments without further distortion of its composition.

Despite the long exposure to degradation under oxic conditions during transport in the water column, and substantially lower concentration of organic matter on the seafloor, there is evidence that planktonic eDNA is preserved in marine sediments and contains exploitable ecological signal. Earlier studies have shown sedaDNA preservation in marine sediments deposited under anoxia with unusually high amounts of organic matter preserved, but later investigations indicate that sedaDNA can also be extracted from normal marine sediments, dominated by clastic or biogenic mineral fractions. In addition, the low temperature of deep-sea water (0–4 °C) ensures a good preservation of sedaDNA. Using planktonic foraminifera as a "Rosetta Stone", allowing benchmarking of sedaDNA signatures by co-occurring fossil tests of these organisms, Morard et al. showed in 2017 that the fingerprint of plankton eDNA arriving on the seafloor preserves the ecological signature of these organisms at a large geographic scale. This indicates that planktonic community eDNA is deposited onto the seafloor below, together with aggregates, skeletons and other sinking planktonic material. If this is true, sedaDNA should be able to record signatures of surface ocean hydrography, affecting the composition of plankton communities, with the same spatial resolution as the skeletal remains of the plankton. In addition, if the plankton eDNA is arriving on the seafloor in association with aggregates or shells, it is possible that it withstands the transport through the water column by fixation onto mineral surfaces. The same mechanism has been proposed to explain the preservation of sedaDNA in sediments, implying that the flux of planktonic eDNA encapsulated in calcite test arriving on the seafloor is conditioned for preservation upon burial.

Planktonic foraminifera sedaDNA is an ideal proxy both "horizontally" to assess the spatial resolution of reconstructing past surface ocean hydrographic features and "vertically", to unambiguously track the burial of its signal throughout the sediment column. Indeed, the flux of planktonic foraminifera eDNA should be proportionate to the flux of dead foraminiferal shells sinking to the seafloor, allowing independent benchmarking of the eDNA signal. eDNA is a powerful tool to study ecosystem because it does not require direct taxonomic knowledge thus allowing information to be gathered on every organism present in a sample, even at the cryptic level. However, assignment of the eDNA sequences to known organisms is done via comparison with reference sequences (or barcodes) made available in public repositories or curated databases. The taxonomy of planktonic foraminifera is well understood and barcodes exist allowing almost complete mapping of eDNA amplicons on the taxonomy based on foraminiferal test morphology. Importantly, the composition of planktonic foraminifera communities is closely linked to surface hydrography and this signal is preserved by fossil tests deposited on the seafloor. Since foraminiferal eDNA accumulated in the ocean sediment can be recovered, it could be used to analyze changes in planktonic and benthic communities over time.

In 2022, two-million-year-old eDNA genetic material was discovered and sequenced in Greenland, and is currently considered the oldest DNA discovered so far.

== Participatory research and citizen science ==
What is eDNA? (short explanatory video from Our Land and Water, New Zealand)

The relative simplicity of eDNA sampling lends itself to projects which seek to involve local communities in being part of research projects, including collecting and analysing DNA samples. This can empower local communities (including Indigenous peoples) to be actively involved in monitoring the species in an environment, and help make informed decisions as part of participatory action research model. An example of such a project has been demonstrated by the charity Science for All with the 'Wild DNA' project.

== See also ==
- Circulating free DNA
- Exogenous DNA
- Extracellular RNA
- RNAs present in environmental samples
- Shadow Effect (Genetics)

== Further references ==
- Schallenberg, Lena; Wood, Susie A.; Pochon, Xavier; Pearman, John K. (2020). "What Can DNA in the Environment Tell Us About an Ecosystem?". Frontiers for Young Minds. 7 150. doi:10.3389/frym.2019.00150. hdl:2292/50690. S2CID 210714520.
