= Shadow effect =

Phenomenon seen in genetic studies

The shadow effect is a phenomenon seen in genetic studies that use noninvasive genetic data collection methods. It occurs when there are not enough loci and/or loci that have low variance of alleles within the population. As a result, researchers can capture two separate individuals and mistakenly label them as the same individual. This can create a negative bias in the data and portray a population as smaller and less genetically diverse than it is. This is most commonly seen in collection methods that rely on environmental DNA (eDNA) which is collected directly from the environment (such as feces or hair removed from the ground). The accuracy of non-invasive collection data can be increased by increasing the amount of loci being examined during the study.

== Background ==
There are several types of rarefaction methods that can be used to estimate the size of a hard monitor species. The study of population size and density falls under demography, the study of populations of any kind of organism.

Mark and recapture is a common form of data collection involving species with large populations. Being able to capture and mark a species in a noninvasive way allows for accurate readings of the population's size, both total and effective over several rounds of recapture. However, for species that are difficult to capture or view directly such as endangered species, it can be near impossible to use the mark-recapture method to obtain genetic samples.

Another method for population size estimation is a real-time polymerase chain reaction (qPCR). qPCR is a molecular approach that measures the amplification of DNA over time rather than just at the end of the reaction. This method is useful because it can rely on eDNA to give an estimate of how abundant a species is in a given habitat.

Noninvasive forms of data collection can be achieved through the collection of fur, feces or other fragments of DNA-rich material left behind (eDNA). Once considered costly, modern advancements have allowed for non-invasive data collection to become easier and provide more genetic information about a population. DNA-Barcoding is a method of species identification that uses eDNA to determine the unique genetic makeup of individuals and their species. This method is that it requires a balancing act: Maintaining enough loci markers in the genetic data, and remaining cost-effective.

Probability of Identity (PI_{AV}) is the probability of a randomly selected sample from a population producing the same genotype twice if not enough loci are used during the study. Should loci with little genetic variation or few loci are selected, it is likely that multiple individuals will be identified as too genetically similar, with individuals being excluded from the data set. This creates a negative statistical bias, pushing the results towards a smaller, less genetically diverse mean than is accurate to the population. This is known as the shadow effect.

== Applications ==
The Cabrera vole (Microtus cabrerae) is a small, endangered rodent that belongs to the Microtus genus. Existing primarily in Portugal, populations can be difficult to estimate using typical mark-recapture methods due to their small size and ability to quickly disperse over large swaths of prairie land. With the introduction and reduced cost of using environmental DNA (in this case feces) were able to be used in a relatively low cost experiment to estimate the population size of the Cabrera vole in southern Portugal in return for sacrificing demographic (age, sex, health) information.

== See also ==
- Endangered Species Act of 1973
