= Tag and release =

Form of catch and release fishing

Pyjama catshark with an ORI "spaghetti" tag on its dorsal fin, prior to being released in Mossel Bay, South Africa

Tag and release is a form of catch and release fishing in which the angler attaches a tag to the fish, records data such as date, time, place, and type of fish on a standardized postcard, and submits this card to a fisheries agency or conservation organization. Anglers who catch tagged fish report their location, date, and time, as well as the tag number to established points of contact. South Carolina has had such a program since 1974.

A tag and release program is in place in NSW, Australia.

== Usage ==
Tags can provide valuable information on the population dynamics, distribution, migration, and behaviour of marine fish. Sharks and rays, in particular, are often poorly studied and threatened by overfishing, habitat loss, and climate change. The data collected can help to improve the understanding and management of these animals, and to support their conservation and sustainable use.

== Cooperative Fish Tagging Project ==
The Cooperative Fish Tagging Project is a citizen science project that was launched by the Oceanographic Research Institute (ORI) in 1984, with the aim of collecting data on the movement, growth, and biology of marine fish, especially sharks and rays, in South Africa and the Indian Ocean region. The project involves tagging fish with plastic tags that have a unique number. The Cooperative Fish Tagging Project also promotes the awareness and involvement of the public, especially the fishing community, in the conservation of marine fish, and encourages the adoption of best practices, such as catch-and-release, selective fishing, and minimal handling. Commercial fishing charters sometimes collaborate with local researchers to carry out the tagging and collect the necessary data. As South Africa is rated among the top five countries globally with the highest diversity of shark and ray species, the Cooperative Fish Tagging Project is vital to collecting data to ensure the species' conservation.

== Oceanographic Research Institute ==
Tags from the Oceanographic Research Institute (ORI) are attached to the fish by trained anglers, charter operators, researchers, and conservationists, who also record the date, location, species, size, and sex of the fish. The tagged fish are then released back into the water, where they can be recaptured by other anglers or researchers, who can report the tag number and the recapture details to ORI. ORI then analyses the data and provides feedback to the taggers and the recapturers. Recapture and release reports are published on their website, and cited in scientific journals.

== See also ==
- Bird ringing – Attachment of a tag to a wild bird to enable individual identification
- Mark and recapture – Animal population estimation method
