= Population (biology) =

Group of individuals of a species, separated from other groups by in some manner

In biology, a population of organisms is a group of individuals of the same species, defined by a discontinuity or disjunction from other groups of individuals in certain characteristics, such as living area, genetic attributes, or demographic structure. Among biologists, the term definition varies, in some cases significantly, and sometimes those variations can be confusing. There are also plenty of other terms to describe groups of individuals if no clear disjunction is present. Commonly, a population can be described by what individuals constitute the population, its size, a geographical area it occupies, and the time within which the population is examined. In qualitative terms, it is usually defined as "a group of organisms of the same species occupying a particular space at a particular time".

The two main approaches to define a population are ecological and evolutionary. From the ecological perspective, individuals are considered interacting and competing in a certain geographic area. From the evolutionary (genetic) perspective, genes and reproduction are considered the driving forces of a population. Since each population has its own gene pool that changes and adapts to the environment over time, the population is considered to be the main organizational unit in biology.

== Etymology ==
The word population is derived from the Late Latin populatio (a people, a multitude), which itself is derived from the Latin word populus (a people).

== Terminology ==
There is no standard terminology to define a population, but there are many definitions of this term. Aside from biology, a population can be commonly defined as a group of units. In biology, those units are individuals. And such a group is separated from other groups by some characteristics (i.e. disjunct from other groups). Populations can be demographically, spatially, or genetically disjunct from each other. Before the 1940s–1950s, the population term was used by biologists and ecologists to describe multiple species of a region, like a population of birds, but the term evolved and is not used this way anymore, describing only members of the same species. Although the term polyspecific population was proposed by some ecologists, but in ecology, the term community is generally used to describe multiple species of a region instead.

Also, there are at least 30 other terms to describe a group of individuals. Some of these terms were introduced because the definitions of the population term were not clear. If individuals of a group are semi-isolated from other groups, or they are more genetically similar, then the term deme can be used. Groups that are not disjunct from other individuals can simply be called groups, or they also can be called subpopulations or local populations. For individuals that are spatially closer to each other than to other individuals, the terms aggregation and cluster can be used. Spatially separated populations of the same species can be called a metapopulation. And all the populations or metapopulations of a species can be called a species population.

In biology (particularly, in evolutionary biology), a population is sometimes defined as a set of individuals that interbreed or that are able to interbreed. In this context, interbreeding individuals are those individuals that can produce an offspring with combined genetic material from both parents. Different populations of the same species are also able to interbreed. But if there are some barriers that prevent interbreeding between different populations, such barriers are called reproductive isolation. In context of these terms, a species can be defined as a group of one or more interbreeding populations when such a group is reproductively isolated.

== Use of the term ==
=== Ecology ===
In ecology, a population is a group of organisms of the same species which inhabit the same geographical area and are capable of interbreeding. The area of a sexual population is the area where interbreeding is possible between any opposite-sex pair within the area and more probable than cross-breeding with individuals from other areas. Ecology studies populations of different species rather than populations of a single species. Such populations as a whole constitute a community. Each community consists of populations of animals and plants that live together, interacting and being dependent on each other. So in ecology, a population of a single species is studied in the context of a community.

In ecology, the population of a certain species in a certain area can be estimated using the Lincoln index to calculate the total population of an area based on the number of individuals observed.

A census, being defined as a complete count of individuals, is rarely possible to conduct in large populations, but it can be useful in small populations that are easy to count, particularly in applied ecology.

==== Dynamics ====
Population dynamics is the type of mathematics used to model and study the size and age composition of populations as dynamical systems. Population dynamics is a branch of mathematical biology, and uses mathematical techniques such as differential equations to model behaviour. Population dynamics is also closely related to other mathematical biology fields such as epidemiology, and also uses techniques from evolutionary game theory in its modelling.

=== Genetics ===
In genetics, a population is often defined as a set of organisms in which any pair of members can breed together. They can thus routinely exchange gametes in order to have usually fertile progeny, and such a breeding group is also known therefore as a gamodeme. This also implies that all members belong to the same species. If the gamodeme is very large (theoretically, approaching infinity), and all gene alleles are uniformly distributed by the gametes within it, the gamodeme is said to be panmictic. Under this state, allele (gamete) frequencies can be converted to genotype (zygote) frequencies by expanding an appropriate quadratic equation, as shown by Sir Ronald Fisher in his establishment of quantitative genetics.

This seldom occurs in nature: localization of gamete exchange – through dispersal limitations, preferential mating, cataclysm, or other cause – may lead to small actual gamodemes which exchange gametes reasonably uniformly within themselves but are virtually separated from their neighboring gamodemes. However, there may be low frequencies of exchange with these neighbors. This may be viewed as the breaking up of a large sexual population (panmictic) into smaller overlapping sexual populations. This failure of panmixia leads to two important changes in overall population structure: (1) the component gamodemes vary (through gamete sampling) in their allele frequencies when compared with each other and with the theoretical panmictic original (this is known as dispersion, and its details can be estimated using expansion of an appropriate binomial equation); and (2) the level of homozygosity rises in the entire collection of gamodemes. The overall rise in homozygosity is quantified by the inbreeding coefficient (f or φ). All homozygotes are increased in frequency – both the deleterious and the desirable. The mean phenotype of the gamodemes collection is lower than that of the panmictic original – which is known as inbreeding depression. It is most important to note, however, that some dispersion lines will be superior to the panmictic original, while some will be about the same, and some will be inferior. The probabilities of each can be estimated from those binomial equations. In plant and animal breeding, procedures have been developed which deliberately utilize the effects of dispersion (such as line breeding, pure-line breeding, backcrossing). Dispersion-assisted selection leads to the greatest genetic advance (ΔG=change in the phenotypic mean), and is much more powerful than selection acting without attendant dispersion. This is so for both allogamous (random fertilization) and autogamous (self-fertilization) gamodemes.

== See also ==
- Community (ecology)
- Disjunctive population
- Human overpopulation
- List of countries by population
- Lists of organisms by population
- Population ethics
- Population geography
