= Frederick Charles Lincoln =

American ornithologist (1892–1960)

Frederick C. Lincoln
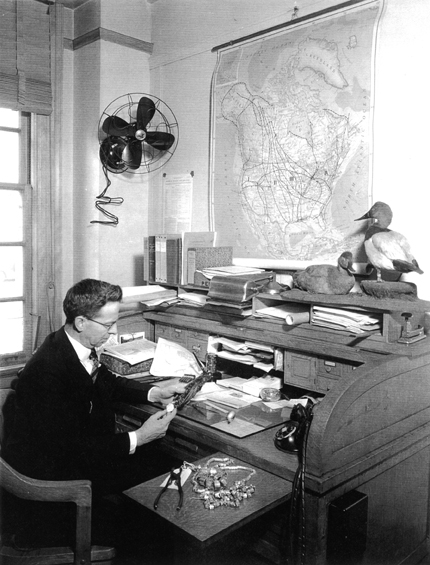
- Lincoln at his desk. From the U.S. National Archives and the U.S. Bird Banding Laboratory.
- Born: May 5, 1892; Denver, Colorado
- Died: September 16, 1960 (aged 68); Washington, D.C.
- Resting place: Arlington National Cemetery
- Known for: Lincoln index, flyway concept
- Scientific career
- Fields: Ornithology

Frederick Charles Lincoln (5 May 1892 – 16 September 1960) was an American ornithologist.

== Early life and family ==
Lincoln was born on 5 May 1892 in Denver, Colorado.

== Career ==
As a teenager working at the Colorado Museum of Natural History in 1909, Lincoln learned to prepare specimens from Alexander Wetmore (who was then a student working at the museum) and L. J. Hershey, the museum's Curator of Ornithology. Lincoln's interest in birds continued to develop, and he eventually went on to succeed Hershey as curator in 1913, a post which he held until 1920. He took time out in 1918–1919 to serve as pigeon expert in the U.S. Army Signal Corps. The professional relationship with Wetmore would continue: the two scientists took field trips together in Washington and Hispaniola and co-wrote eight publications.

In 1920, Lincoln joined the U.S. Bureau of Biological Survey (at the time, a unit of the United States Department of Agriculture, and now part of the United States Fish and Wildlife Service) and was given the task of organizing and expanding the bird banding program nationwide. The Migratory Bird Treaty Act of 1918 had established federal responsibility for migratory birds; the result was that the North American Bird Banding Program took the place of earlier smaller-scale efforts by individuals and the short-lived American Bird Banding Association. During the period of his tenure, 1920–1946, Lincoln was highly influential: he improved methods for trapping and banding, developed record-keeping procedures, recruited banders, fostered international cooperation, and promoted banding as a tool for research and wildlife management. He proposed a means to estimate the continent-wide population size of a bird species, using reports from hunters and counting "returns" (birds killed that are wearing bands); this metric became known as the Lincoln index. He developed the flyway concept, a key idea in the management and regulation of hunting of migratory birds.

Lincoln joined the American Ornithologists' Union in 1910 and was elected a Fellow of the organization in 1934.

== Later life and death ==
Lincoln died on 16 September 1960 in Washington, D.C. and was buried in Arlington National Cemetery.

== Legacy and recognition ==
Lincoln was elected a fellow of the American Ornithologists' Union in 1934. He received an honorary Doctor of Science degree from the University of Colorado in 1956; in 1957, the Department of the Interior recognized him with its Distinguished Service Award.

== Selected publications ==
- Lincoln, Frederick C. (April–June 1921). "The History and Purposes of Bird Banding". The Auk. 38 (2): 217–228. doi:10.2307/4073884. JSTOR 4073884.
- Lincoln, Frederick C. (April 1921). Instructions for Bird Banding. Circular. Vol. 170. Washington, DC: United States Department of Agriculture.
- Lincoln, Frederick C.; Baldwin, Samuel Prentiss (November 1929). Manual for Bird Banders. Miscellaneous Publication. Vol. 58. Washington, DC: United States Department of Agriculture.
- Lincoln, Frederick C. (May 1930). Calculating Waterfowl Abundance on the Basis of Banding Returns. Circular. Vol. 118. Washington, DC: United States Department of Agriculture.
- Phillips, John C.; Lincoln, Frederick C. (1930). American Waterfowl. Boston, MA: Houghton Mifflin Company.
- Lincoln, Frederick C. (January 1935). The Waterfowl Flyways of North America. Circular. Vol. 342. Washington, DC: United States Department of Agriculture. doi:10.5962/bhl.title.64010.
- Lincoln, Frederick C. (October 1935). The Migration of North American Birds. Circular. Vol. 363. Washington, DC: United States Department of Agriculture. doi:10.5962/bhl.title.64016.
- Lincoln, Frederick C.; Fuertes, Louis Agassiz (1939). The Migration of American Birds. New York, NY: Doubleday, Doran & Company.
- Gabrielson, Ira N.; Lincoln, Frederick C. (1959). Birds of Alaska. Harrisburg, PA: The Stackpole Company.

== Bibliography ==
- Gabrielson, Ira N. (July–September 1962). "Obituary". The Auk. 79 (3): 495–499. doi:10.2307/4082843. JSTOR 4082843.
- Tautin, John (2005). "Frederick C. Lincoln and the Formation of the North American Bird Banding Program" (PDF). In Ralph, C. John; Rich, Terrell D. (eds.). Bird Conservation Implementation and Integration in the Americas. Third International Partners in Flight Conference. 2002 March 20–24; Asilomar, California. Albany, California: U.S. Department of Agriculture, Forest Service, Pacific Southwest Research Station. pp. 813–814. Gen. Tech. Rep. GTR-PSW-191.
