= Abundance estimation =

Group of statistical methods

Abundance estimation comprises all statistical methods for estimating the number of individuals in a population. In ecology, this may be anything from estimating the number of daisies in a field to estimating the number of blue whales in the ocean. Abundance estimates are foundational for tracking wildlife populations, assessing biodiversity in an area, evaluating conservation efforts, managing invasive species, and informing resource management.

Abundance estimates allow scientists and researchers to monitor population changes, identify threats to an environment, and evaluate ecological interventions. Abundance estimates can be measured either directly through counting populations or indirectly through statistical models.

== Importance in Ecology ==
Abundance estimation plays a central role in ecological research since most species are unable to be fully observed, leaving population size to be inferred through statistical methods. Detectability across species can vary based on their habitats, environmental factors, and conditions. Today, ecology is reliant on statistical models which can account for sampling bias and uncertainty. Abundance estimates today have become essential for researchers trying to predict species responses to climate change and study population and community dynamics.

== Applications ==
Abundance estimation is used in a variety of fields including wildlife management, fisheries science, and conservation biology. Both government agencies and research organizations utilize abundance data to establish harvest quotas, study population trends, and assess the conservation status of threatened and invasive species. A variety of methods are used in abundance sampling: mark-recapture, plot sampling, distance sampling.

Terrestrial and marine habitats require different methods. In marine environments, remote-sensing approaches and acoustic surveys are used to estimate the population abundance and biomass of different species. Through these methods, researchers are able to monitor population changes in response to climate change and environmental conditions.
